= History of the violin =

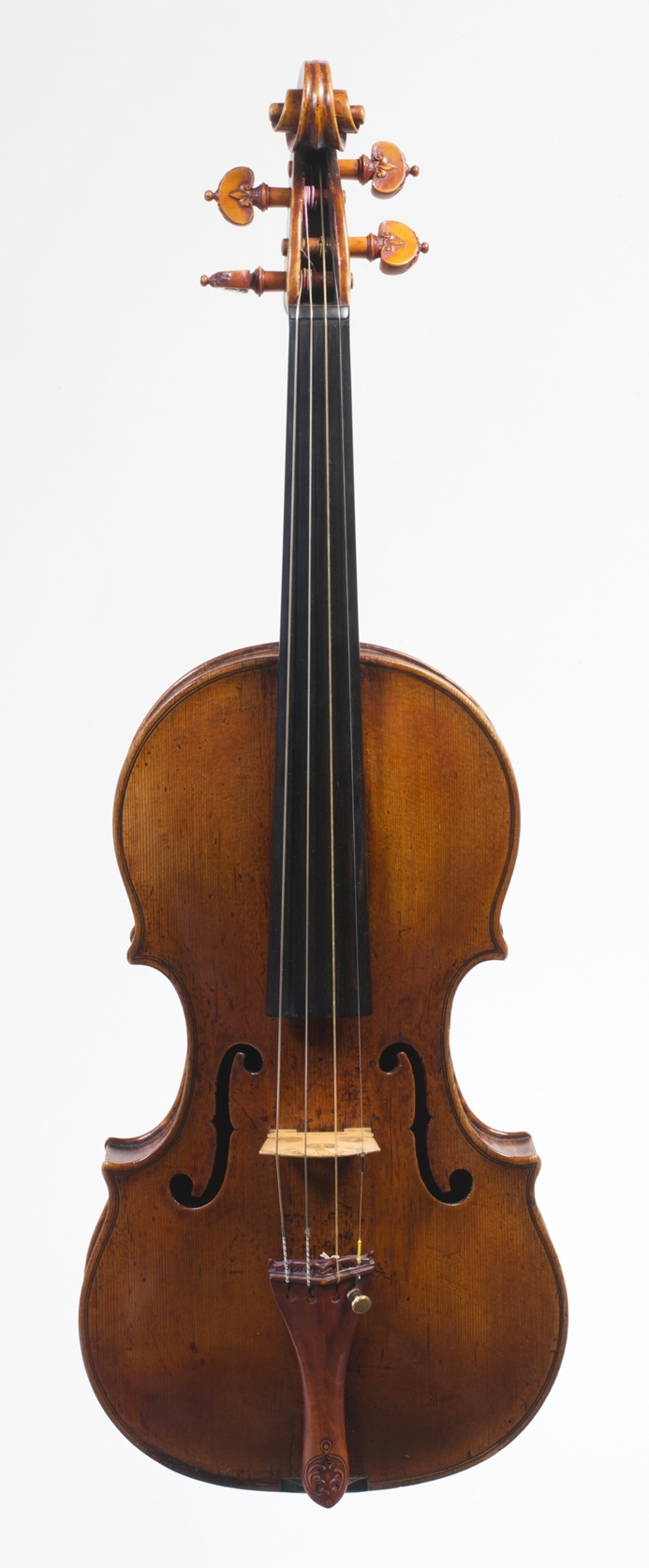
A violin made c. 1560 by Andrea Amati, who is credited with making the first instruments of the violin family.

The violin, viola and cello were first built in the early 16th century, in Italy. The earliest evidence for their existence is in paintings by Gaudenzio Ferrari from the 1530s, though Ferrari's instruments had only three strings. The Académie musicale, a treatise written in 1556 by Philibert Jambe de Fer, gives a clear description of the violin family much as it is known today.

Violins are likely to have been developed from a number of other string instruments of the 15th and 16th centuries, including the vielle, rebec, and lira da braccio. The history of bowed string instruments in Europe goes back to the 9th century with the Eastern Roman/Byzantine lyra (or lūrā, Roman Greek: λύρα).

Since their invention, instruments in the violin family have seen a number of changes. The overall pattern for the instrument was set in the 17th century by luthiers like the prolific Amati family, Jacob Stainer of Tyrol, and Antonio Stradivari, with many makers at the time and since following their templates.

== Early history ==
The origin of the violin family is unclear. Some say that the bow was introduced to Europe from the Byzantine Empire and the Islamic world, while others say the bow was not introduced from the Middle East but the other way around, and that the bow may have originated from more frequent contact between Northern and Western Europe.

The Welsh crwth (crowd, crouth), or, in its Latinized form, the chrotta or crotta, is quite a peculiar, very old instrument. Venantius Fortunatus specified it as British (crotta Britanna canit) as early as 566–576 AD. The crotta was originally strung with three, later with six, strings, and was played with a bow. It is quite possible that the crotta is the oldest bowed instrument and the ancestor of the violin.

The origin of bowing is obscure. The two earliest bowed instruments are the ravanahatha and the omerti found in India and made of a hollowed cylinder of sycamore wood. They were played in the manner of a cello. Also in China, another two-stringed bowed instrument was the erhu. Rühlmann said that the Indian instrument was not proven to be either old, original, or primitive, and that he believed that the bow originated independently in different places.

The Persian geographer Ibn Khordadbeh (d. 913) of the 9th century was the first to cite the bowed Byzantine lyra as a typical instrument of the Byzantines and equivalent to the rabāb used in the Islamic Empires of that time. The Byzantine lyra spread through Europe westward and in the 11th and 12th centuries European writers use the terms fiddle and lira interchangeably when referring to bowed instruments. In the meantime, the rabāb was introduced to the Western Europe possibly through the Iberian Peninsula, and both bowed instruments spread widely throughout Europe, giving birth to various European bowed instruments. During the Renaissance, the rebec came in different sizes and pitches: soprano, tenor, and bass. The smaller versions of the instrument were known in Italy as ribecchini and in France as rubechettes.

Over the centuries that followed, Europe continued to have two distinct types of bowed instruments: one, relatively square-shaped, held in the arms, known with the Italian term lira da braccio (meaning 'viol for the arm') family; the other, with sloping shoulders and held between the knees, known with the Italian term lira da gamba (or viola da gamba, meaning 'viol for the leg') group. During the Renaissance the gambas were important and elegant instruments. The very successful family of fretted viols appeared in Europe only few years before the violin. They eventually lost ground to the louder (and originally viewed as less aristocratic) lira da braccio family of the modern violin.

== Emergence ==
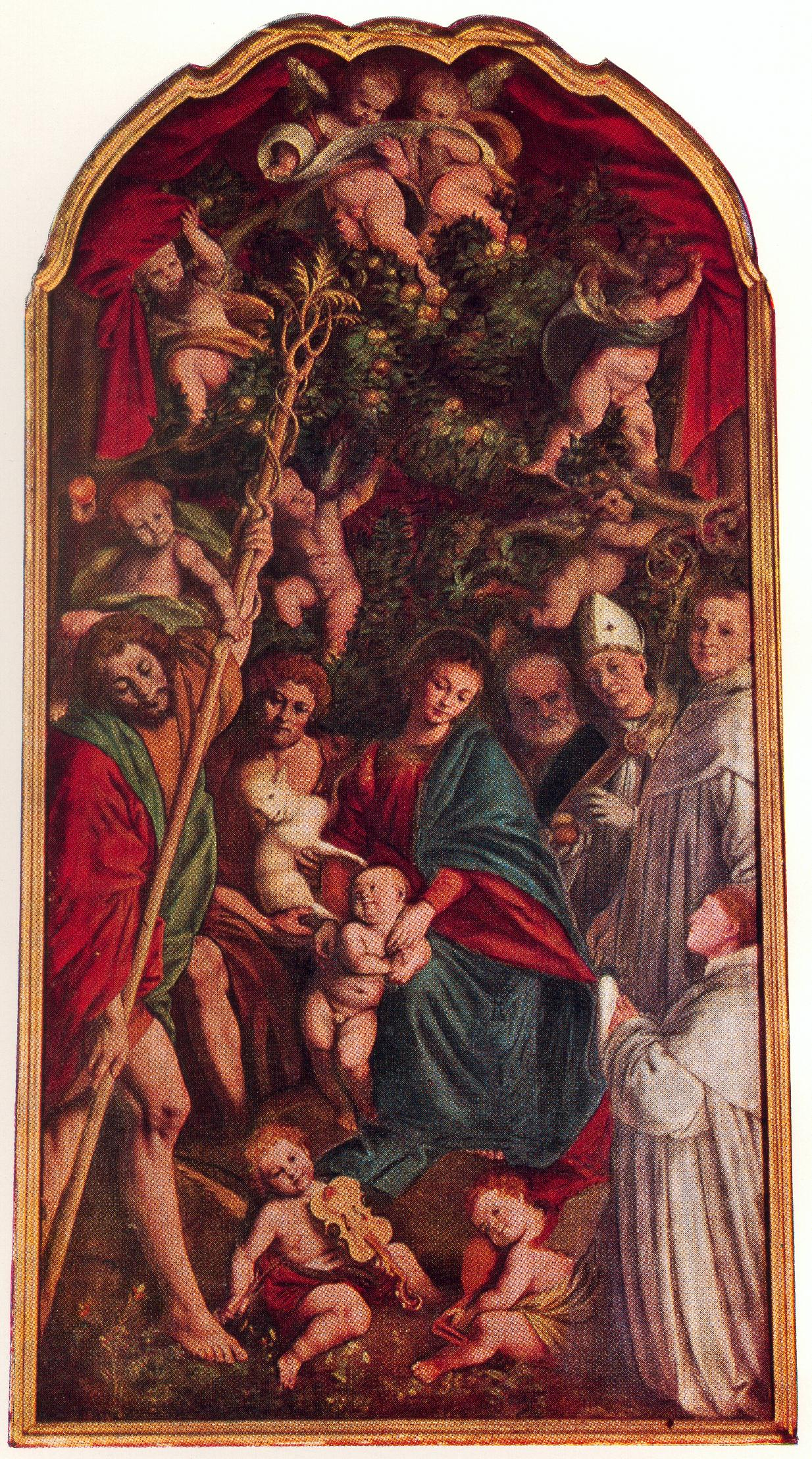
Gaudenzio Ferrari's Madonna of the Orange Trees, from 1529 to 1530. Bottom, left of centre, is an infant playing a three-stringed violin.

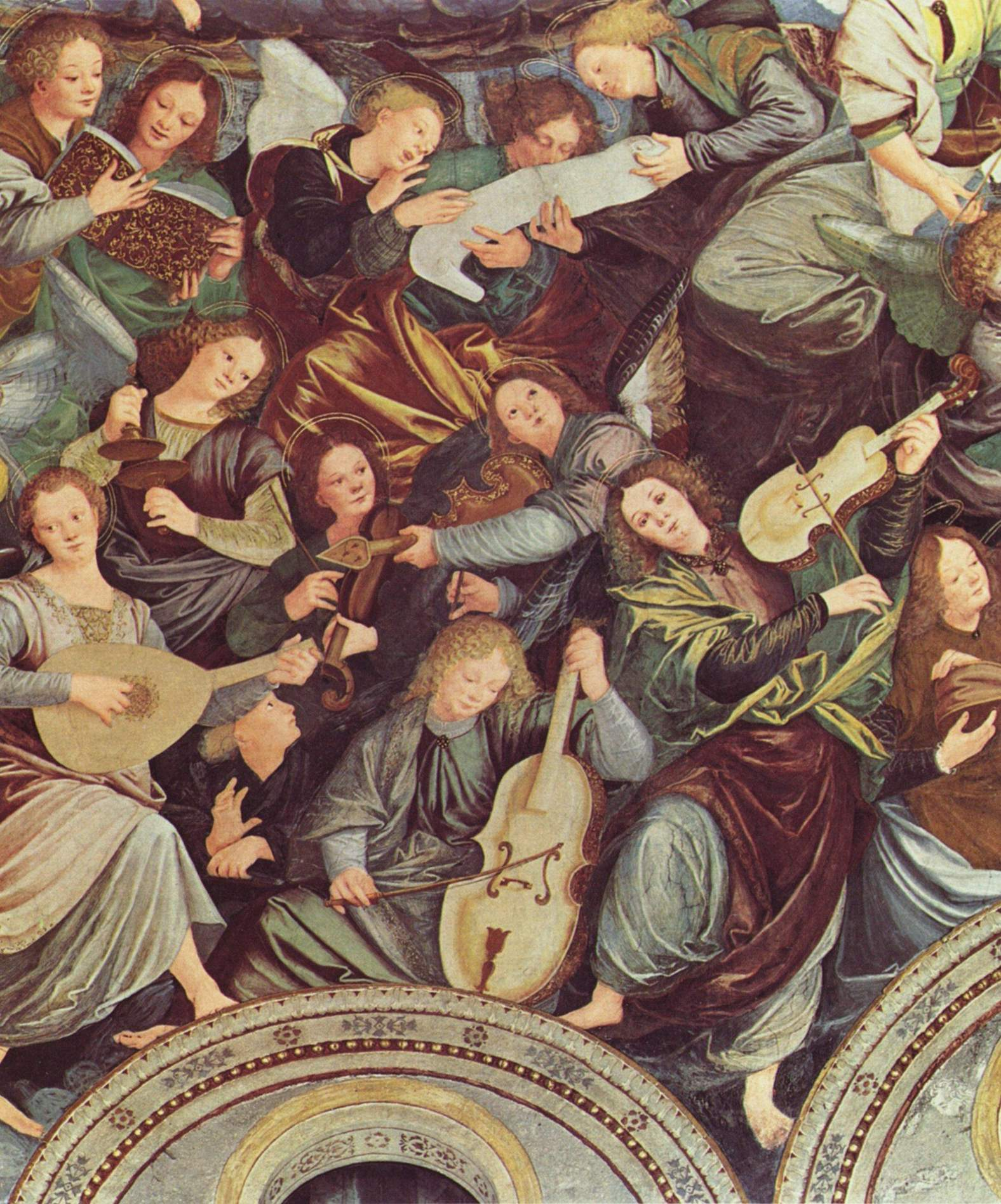
The cupola of Madonna dei Miracoli in Saronno, with angels playing violin, viola and cello

The first clear record of a violin-like instrument comes from paintings by Gaudenzio Ferrari. In his Madonna of the Orange Tree, painted in 1530, a cherub is seen playing a bowed instrument which clearly has the hallmarks of violins. A few years later, on a fresco in the cupola of the church of Madonna dei Miracoli in Saronno, angels play three instruments of the violin family, corresponding to violin, viola and cello. The instruments depicted by Ferrari have bulging front and back plates, strings that feed into peg-boxes with side pegs, and f-holes. They do not have frets. The only real difference between those instruments and the modern violin is that Ferrari's have three strings and a rather more extravagant curved shape. It is not clear exactly who made the first violins, but there is good evidence that they originate from northern Italy, near Milan. Not only are Ferrari's paintings in that area but also towns like Brescia and Cremona then had a great reputation for the craftsmanship of stringed instruments.

The earliest documentary evidence for a violin is in the records of the treasury of Savoy, which paid for "trompettes et vyollons de Verceil", that is to say, "trumpets and violins from Vercelli", the town where Ferrari painted his Madonna of the Orange Tree. The first extant written use of the Italian term violino occurs in 1538, when "violini Milanesi" (Milanese violinists) were brought to Nice when negotiating the conclusion of a war.

The violin quickly became very popular, both among street-musicians and the nobility, which is illustrated by the fact that Charles IX of France commissioned an extensive range of string instruments in the second half of the 16th century. Around 1555, the French court imported a dance band of Italian violinists and in 1573, during one of Catherine de' Medici's celebration "the music was the most melodious one had ever seen and the ballet was accompanied by some thirty violins playing very pleasantly a warlike tune", wrote an observer.

The oldest confirmed surviving violin, dated inside, is the "Charles IX" by Andrea Amati, made in Cremona in 1564, but the label is very doubtful. The Metropolitan Museum of Art has an Amati violin that may be even older, possibly dating to 1558 but just like the Charles IX the date is unconfirmed. One of the most famous and certainly the most pristine is the Messiah Stradivarius (also known as the 'Salabue') made by Antonio Stradivari in 1716 and very little played, perhaps almost never and in an as new state. It is now located in the Ashmolean Museum of Oxford.

== Early makers ==
Instruments of approximately 300 years of age, especially those made by Stradivari and Guarneri del Gesù, are the most sought-after, by both performers and (generally wealthier) collectors. In addition to the skill and reputation of the maker, an instrument's age can also influence both price and quality. The violin has 70 parts, 72 if top and bottom plates are each made from two pieces of wood.

The most famous violin makers, between the early 16th century and the 18th century included:

- Micheli family of Italian violin makers, Zanetto Micheli (1490–1560), Pellegrino Micheli (1520–1607), Giovanni Micheli (1562–1616), Francesco Micheli (1579–1615), and the brother in law Battista Doneda (1529–1610)
- Bertolotti da Salò family of Italian violin and double bass players and makers: Francesco (1513–1563) and Agostino (1510–1584) Bertolotti, Gasparo Bertolotti (1540–1609) called Gasparo da Salò
- Giovanni Paolo Maggini (1580–1630), pupil of Gasparo da Salò
- Giovanni Battista Rogeri (1642–1710)
- Amati family of Italian violin makers, Andrea Amati (1500–1577), Antonio Amati (1540–1607), Hieronymous Amati I (1561–1630), Nicola Amati (1596–1684), Hieronymous Amati II (1649–1740)
- Guarneri family of Italian violin makers, Andrea Guarneri (1626–1698), Pietro of Mantua (1655–1720), Giuseppe Giovanni Battista Guarneri (Joseph filius Andreae) (1666–1739), Pietro Guarneri (of Venice) (1695–1762), and Giuseppe Guarneri (del Gesu) (1698–1744)
- Antonio Stradivari (1644–1737) of Cremona, Italy
- Rugeri family of violin makers of Cremona, Italy. Francesco Rugeri (1628–1698), and Vincenzo Rugeri (1663–1719)
- Carlo Bergonzi (1683–1747) of Cremona, Italy
- Jacob Stainer (1617–1683) of Absam in Tyrol

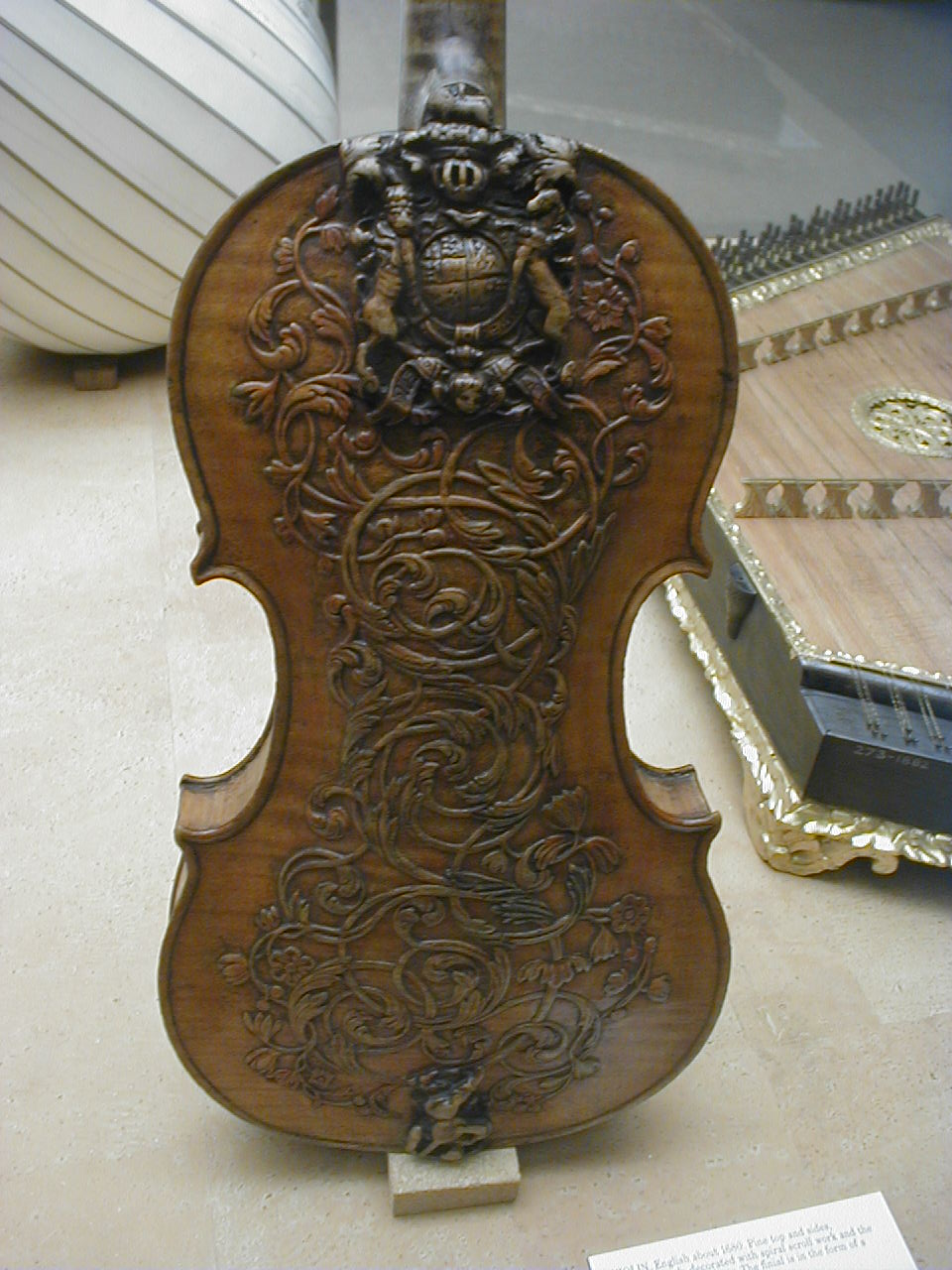
Intricately carved 17th century (circa 1660) British Royal Family violin, on display in the Victoria and Albert Museum in London

== Baroque to modern form ==
Between the 16th and 19th centuries, several changes occurred, including:

- The fingerboard was made a little longer to be able to play even the highest notes (in the 19th century).
- The fingerboard was tilted a little more, to produce even more volume as larger and larger orchestras became popular.
- Nearly all old instruments were modified, including lengthening of the neck by one centimeter, in response to the raising of pitch that occurred in the 19th century.
- The bass bar of nearly all old instruments was made heavier to allow a greater string tension.
- The classical luthiers "nailed" and glued the instrument necks to the upper block of the body before gluing on the soundboard, while later luthiers mortise the neck to the body after completely assembling the body.
- The chinrest was invented in the early 19th century by Louis Spohr.

The results of these adjustments are instruments that are significantly different in sound and response from those that left the hands of their makers. Regardless, most violins nowadays are built superficially resembling the old instruments.

== Trade violins ==
In the 19th and 20th centuries numerous violins were produced in France, Saxony and the Mittenwald in what is now Germany, in the Tyrol, now parts of Austria and Italy, and in Bohemia, now part of the Czech Republic.

About seven million violin family instruments and basses, and far more bows, were shipped from Markneukirchen between 1880 and 1914. Many 19th and early 20th century instruments shipped from Saxony were in fact made in Bohemia, where the cost of living was less. While the French workshops in Mirecourt employed hundreds of workers, the Saxon/Bohemian instruments were made by a cottage industry of "mostly anonymous skilled laborers quickly turning out a simple, inexpensive product".

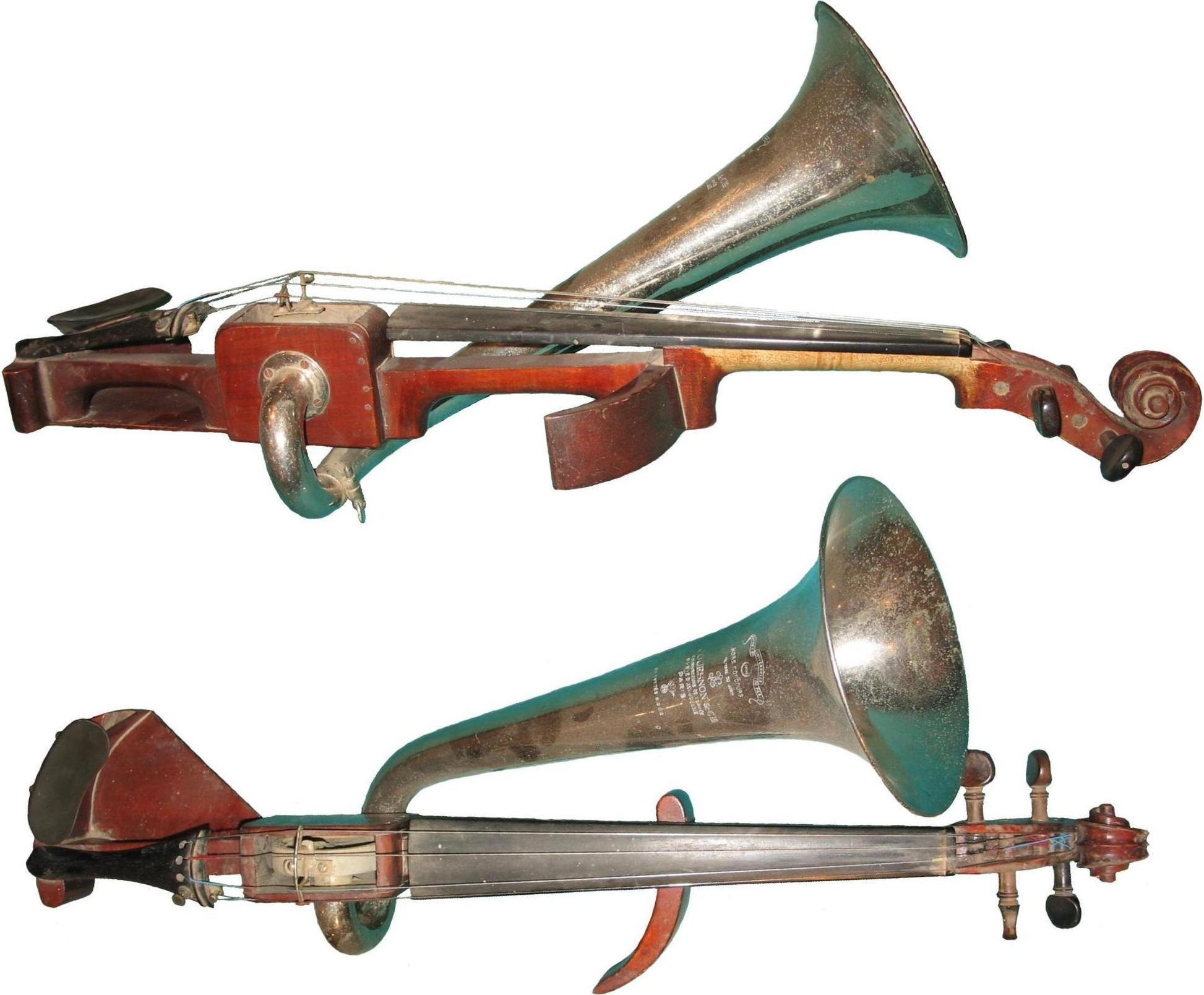
Stroh violin

Today this market also sees instruments coming from China, Romania, and Bulgaria.

== Recent inventions ==
More recently, the Stroh violin used mechanical amplification similar to that of an unelectrified gramophone to boost sound volume. Some Stroh violins have a small "monitor" horn pointed at the player's ear, for audibility on a loud stage, where the main horn points at the audience. In the late 19th and early 20th centuries before electronic sound amplification became common, Stroh violins were used particularly in the recording studio. These violins with directional horns better suited the demands of the early recording industry's technology than the traditional violin. Stroh was not the only person who made instruments of this class. Over twenty different inventions appear in the patent books up to 1949. Often mistaken for Stroh and interchangeably known as being Stroh-viols, phono-fiddles, horn-violins or trumpet-violins, these other instruments have slipped into comparative obscurity.

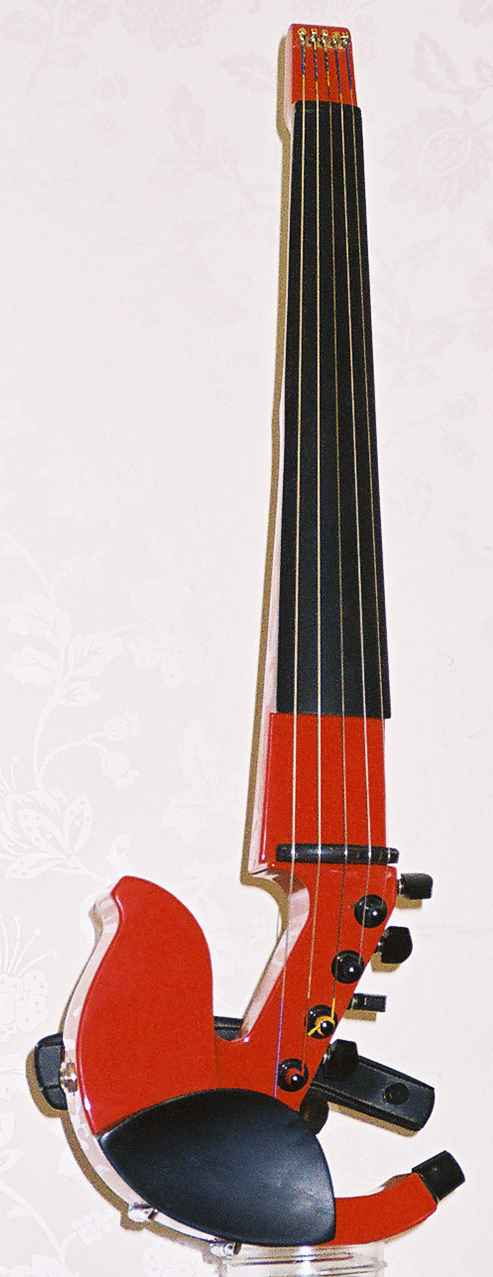
Electric 5-string violin

The history of the electric violin spans the entire 20th century. The success of electrical amplification, recording and playback devices brought an end to the use of the Stroh violin in broadcast and recording. Acoustic-electric violins have a hollow body with soundholes, and may be played with or without amplification. Solid-body electric violins produce very little sound on their own, and require the use of an electronic sound reinforcement system, which usually includes equalization and may also apply sonic effects.

Electric violins may have four strings, or as many as seven strings. Since the strength of materials imposes limits on the upper string, it is usually tuned to E_{5}, with additional strings tuned in fifths below the usual G_{3} of a typical four-string violin. The five-string electric violin shown here was built by John Jordan in the early 21st century, and is tuned C–G–D–A–E.
