= Amati (disambiguation) =

Amati is the last name of a family of Italian violin makers who lived at Cremona from about 1538 to 1740, and may refer specifically to:

- Andrea Amati (v. 1505/1510–1577)
- Antonio Amati (1540–1638), son of Andrea Amati
- Girolamo Amati (1561–1630), son of Andrea Amati
- Niccolò Amati (1596–1684), son of Girolamo Amati
- Girolamo Amati (Hieronymus II) (1649–1740), son of Niccolò Amati

Amati may also refer to:

- Amati (ritual), a fertility cult in Western Assam, India
- Amati Cars, a planned but cancelled Mazda luxury brand
- Amati-Denak, a Czech musical instrument manufacturing company
- Amati Quartet, a Canadian string quartet
- 19183 Amati, a main-belt asteroid
- Amaţi, a village in Păuleşti, Satu Mare, Romania

== Other people with the surname ==
- Basilio Amati (1780–1830), Italian author
- Carlo Amati (1776–1852), Italian architect
- Daniele Amati (born 1931), Italian theoretical physicist
- Edmondo Amati (1920–2002), Italian film producer
- Federico Pedini Amati (born 1976), San-Marino politician
- Giacinto Amati (theologian) (1778–1850), Italian Catholic theologian
- Girolamo Amati (philologist) (1768–1834), Italian classical philologist, Graecist, epigraphist, paleographer, and manuscript historian
- Giovanna Amati (born 1959), Italian automobile racer
- Pasquale Amati (1716–1796), Italian scholar
- Silvana Amati (born 1947), Italian politician
- Tony Ray Amati (born 1976), American serial killer

== See also ==
- Giovanni Antonio Amato (surname sometimes rendered as Amati) (1475–1555), Italian painter
