= Royal Academy of Music Museum =

Museum in London, England

Coordinates: 51.5233°N 0.1521°W

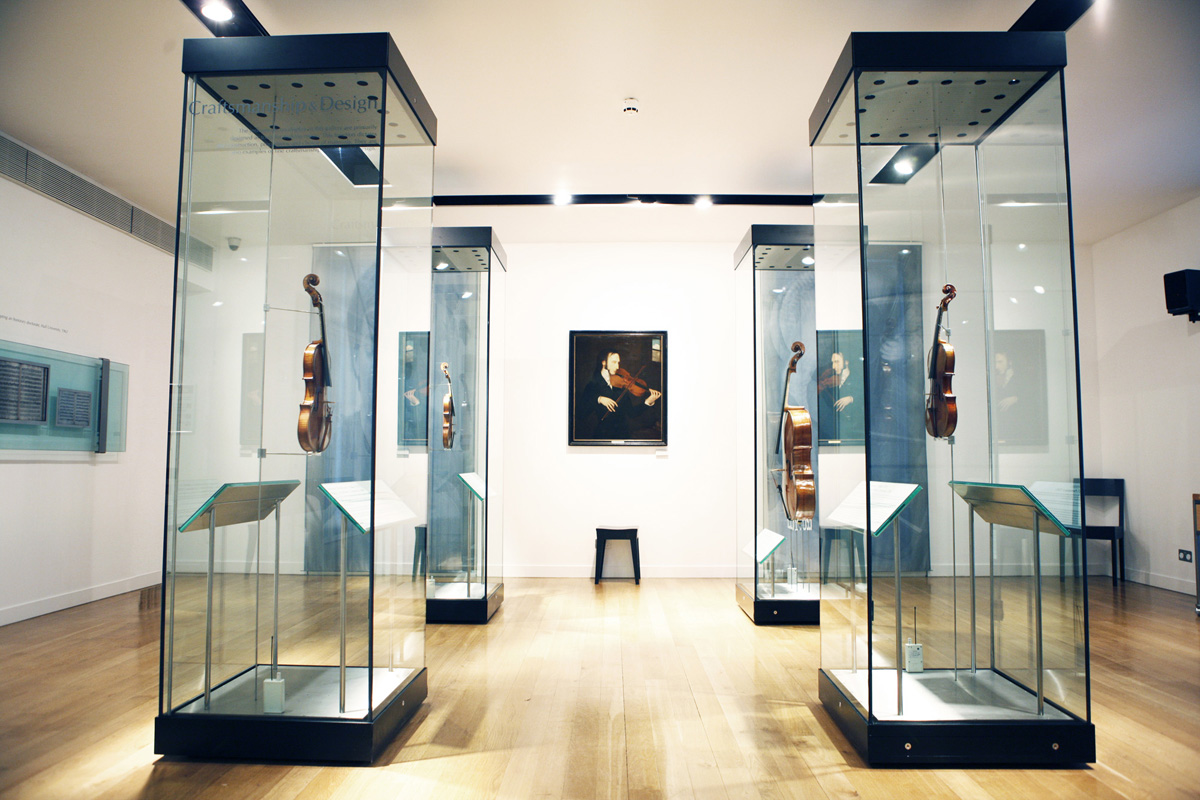
Full view of string gallery in the Royal Academy of Music Museum

The Royal Academy of Music Museum (previously known as the York Gate Collections) is a museum of musical instruments and artefacts and a research centre of the Royal Academy of Music in London.

== The building ==
The building was designed in 1822 as part of the main entrance to Regent's Park, and was an important feature in John Nash’s architectural designs for Regency London. The interior of York Gate was largely destroyed by bomb damage in the 1940s, but the Nash exterior has Grade I listed building status. The Royal Academy of Music moved to Marylebone Road in 1911, and held a lease on part of York Gate during the 1920s and 1930s. A grant from the Heritage Lottery Fund enabled the Academy to acquire and refurbish the building to house studios and practice rooms and a museum.

== The galleries ==
The Museum has three permanent galleries, alongside regularly changing displays and exhibitions. Together they cover an array of eras, instruments and subjects, including stringed instruments from the 16th century onwards. The galleries act as a showcase for the work of performers, composers, instrument makers and scholars from a wide range of musical and other relevant disciplines.

=== The Ground Floor Gallery ===
The Museum has recently undergone refurbishment and now contains a 'History of the Academy' display that includes items from notable musicians associated with the Academy: one of Sir Henry Wood's conducting batons, letters by Felix Mendelssohn and the restored Alexander horn which was played by Dennis Brain, damaged in the crash which killed him, and subsequently restored by Paxman of London.

The Ground floor gallery also houses regularly changing temporary exhibitions. These have included "Yehudi Menuhin: Journeys with a Violin", which was drawn from the extensive Foyle Menuhin Archive held by the academy. It accompanied the 2016 Menuhin Competition in London and marks 100 years since the birth of Yehudi Menuhin.

=== The Strings Gallery ===
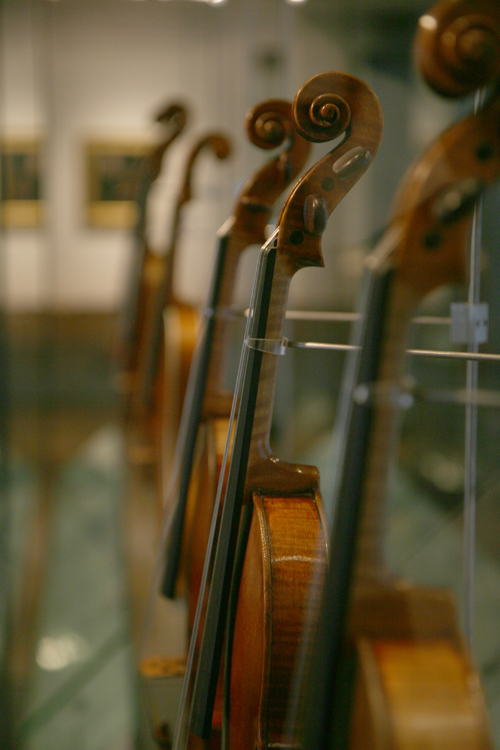
The Strings Gallery.

A selection of Cremonese instruments is on display in the Strings gallery. The exhibition features examples of instruments by makers Stradivari and Amati, as well as historical information, prints and engravings. The exhibition includes the ‘Viotti ex-Bruce’ violin by Stradivari which was saved for the nation in 2005. The instruments on display form part of the Royal Academy of Music's fine collection of over 250 stringed instruments from the violin family. The collection includes examples of the work of the finest and most influential makers. These instruments are frequently played in concerts and recordings but are normally kept in the academy. The present form of the collection can be said to date from 1890 when John Rutson (1829–1906) gave an important group of instruments to the academy. The Rutson Collection includes the Archinto viola (1696), the Rutson violin (1694) and the Maurin violin all by Stradivari, as well as instruments by members of the Amati family, Pressenda and other influential makers.

=== The Piano gallery ===
The exhibition features pianos placed on loan by Kenneth and Mary Mobbs, Oswald de Sybel, Andrew Hunter-Johnston, the Beare family, and the Stodart grand piano bequeathed by Frank Brown.

== The collections ==
Since its foundation in 1822 the academy has acquired important collections of instruments, manuscripts, letters, performance editions, artworks, teaching materials, memorabilia and other objects. Within this are many collections named after individuals, including those relating to the conductors John Barbirolli, Otto Klemperer, Henry Wood and Charles Mackerras, pianist Harriet Cohen, the concert agent Norman McCann, lutenist and scholar Robert Spencer, composer Arthur Sullivan, jazz star Kenny Wheeler and the Foyle Menuhin Archive. The collections also include items concerning the history of the institution such as student registers, programmes, prize boards, certificates, medals and commemorative photographs.

=== Manuscripts ===
The academy houses original manuscripts by Purcell, Schubert, Mendelssohn, Liszt, Brahms, Sullivan and Vaughan Williams, musical memorabilia and other exhibits.

=== String instruments ===
The academy holds a collection of more than 200 stringed instruments from the violin family. These have been acquired for the benefit of students and recent leavers and they are maintained by the academy's resident luthier. The collections include several instruments of the Stradivarius family, including the Rutson (1694), Kustendyke (1699), Viotti-ex-Bruce (1709), Maurin (1718), and the Habeneck (1734), violas Archinto (1699), cello Marquis de Corberon-ex-Loeb (1726). Other instruments include Nicolo Amati violin (1662), Girolamo II violin (c.1671) and violin (1719), violin by Antonio and Girolamo Amati (1629) and a Hieronymus Amati violin (1719).

=== Other collections ===
Other collections include the Foyle Menuhin archive (letters, music, photographs, artworks and more collected by Yehudi Menuhin over his lifetime), Jenny Lind (1820–1887) Collection, David Munrow (1942–1976) Collection, the Priaulx Rainier (1903–1986) Collection and The McCann Collection.

== See also ==
- List of music museums
