= Amati Quartet =

Canadian string quartet formed 2003

- Origin: Saskatoon, Saskatchewan, Canada
- Genres: Classical music
- Years active: 2003–2018
- Members: Murray Adaskin; Norma Lee Bisha; Michael Bowie; Edward Bisha; Robert Klose; Marla Cole; Michael Swan; Geoff Cole; Linda Bardutz; Luke Hnenny; Peter Hedlin; Evan Barber; Rudolf Sternadel; Terence Sturge; Sam Milner

The Amati Quartet was a string quartet, associated with the University of Saskatchewan in Saskatoon, Saskatchewan, Canada. The ensemble performed with four instruments made by the Amati family of luthiers, of Cremona Italy.

== Instruments ==
The University of Saskatchewan instruments are the only set in Canada made by the Amati family. The 1637 violin previously belonged to the Australian concert violinist Daisy Kennedy (1893–1981). The viola's back bears the painted crest, or coat of arms, of the House of Borghese, which originally commissioned it.

- Violin 1637, Nicola Amati (Nicolo)
- Violin 1627, Antonio & Girolamo Amati
- Viola 1607, Antonio & Girolamo Amati
- Cello 1690, Girolamo Amati II, aka Hieronymus II

== Acquisition of the instruments ==
The Amati instruments, two violins, a viola and a cello, were acquired in 1959, from Kindersley farmer and collector Stephen Kolbinson, who sold them to the university at the urging of his friend Murray Adaskin, then the director of the university's music department. The sale price was C$20,000 (equivalent to $215,000 in 2025), considerably less than their 1959 value, but both men held the deep desire that the instruments be shared with the people of Saskatchewan. In 2016, the combined value of the instruments exceeded $3 million (equivalent to $3.8 million in 2025).

== The First Amati Quartet (1968–1971) ==
In 1968, the first Amati String Quartet was founded by Murray Adaskin and three other faculty members of the University of Saskatchewan: Norma Lee Bisha (second violin), Michael Bowie (viola), and Edward Bisha (cello). It gave its first concert on 2 February 1969. Later that same year, Robert Klose was named second violin and Norma Lee Bisha replaced Michael Bowie. The personnel remained stable until the group was supplanted in 1971 by the Canadian Arts Trio after fewer than 10 formal concerts. The quartet was too short-lived to develop a wide repertoire or a distinctive style.

From 1992 to 1998, the instruments were on loan to the University of Victoria's Lafayette String Quartet, and were then returned to the University of Saskatchewan, held in storage and rarely used in performance. In 2003, in response to growing calls for the instruments to be heard, the Amati Quartet was re-established, with musicians who were already performing under the name The Cole Quartet.

== The Amati Quartet (2003–) ==
The Amati Quartet in Residence was established in August 2003 with Marla Cole (first violin), Michael Swan (second violin), Geoff Cole (viola) and Linda Bardutz (cello). In 2004, Luke Hnenny became second violinist and Peter Hedlin replaced Bardutz as cellist. The Amati Quartet performed a yearly recital series, and played at various University of Saskatchewan events. In May 2005, it performed for Queen Elizabeth II during her visit in honour of Saskatchewan's 100th anniversary, and undertook a project to perform all of Joseph Haydn’s string quartets.

== Passion for Haydn, From the Heart ==
It was Marla Cole's wish that the quartet record an album. After she was diagnosed with breast cancer, she was able to secure financial help from The Cameco Riders' Touchdown for Dreams program, a partnership between Cameco, the Saskatchewan Roughriders, the Saskatchewan Cancer Agency, and the Cancer Foundation of Saskatchewan. The album Passion for Haydn was released in 2016. Cole died in 2017; in 2018, the quartet released the album From the Heart, which is dedicated to her.

== Final concert, 2018 ==
In June 2018, the Amati Quartet played its last concert, which was a fundraiser for the Marla Cole Memorial Fund. The musicians were her husband Geoff Cole (viola), Rudy Sternadel (violin), Terence Sturge (cello) and violinist Sam Milner.

The instruments remain in the possession of the university.

== Discography ==
- Passion for Haydn (2016)
- From the Heart (2018)
