= Hieronymus II double bass =

The double bass made by Hieronymus II AMATI in 1680 in Cremona, Italy, is known as the only remaining double bass from the early Cremonese school.

The double bass bears an original label "Nicolaus . Filei Hieronymi Filius An' (drea) Amatus" "Cremonensis Faciebat Anno 1680", the type of label Hieronymus II (also known as Girolomo II) used while still under the guidance and working with his father Nicòlo.

This Amati double bass was most lately restored by Barnabás Rácz, Hungary, in 2006. In the same year it was subjected to a dendro-chronological examination by John C. Topham, England, which dates the latest year-rings from 1659 and proves a perfect cross-match with wood used by contemporaries Sanctus Serafin and Antonio Stradivari.

In 2010 the instrument was certified by Peter Biddulph. He writes; "this double bass is in a very fine state of preservation. It is an exceptionally rare and important instrument, fully characteristic of the work of Hieronymus II Amati in the workshop of his father, Nicòlo Amati. Authentic Cremonese basses of this early period are all but unknown." Several other leading experts also have approved its origins.

Considering the life-span of over three centuries, the bass is still in excellent condition;

The belly is made of pine in five pieces of narrow to medium grain and has a low to medium arching. The flat back is made of two pieces of Italian ash, with original wings added. The sides are made of the same Italian ash, which Hieronymus II Amati also used for several of his cello's. The head is made of plain maple, cut similarly as scrolls of smaller instruments known of this maker. The original Cremonese varnish is particularly recognizable at the belly. Under UV-light all major parts are homogenous.

Late 2010 the instrument was acquired by a chamber-music lover and investor, who generously has given it to Dutch double bassist Niek de Groot, as a lifelong loan. Since then it has been played to a growing audience in many major concert-venues throughout the world.

Since 2016 the bass is played by Kenneth Ryland solo double bassist of the Oslo Philharmonic Orchestra.

www.niekdegroot.nl

http://www.peterbiddulph.com/
