= Jacob Stainer =

Austrian luthier (c.1618–1683)

- Jakob Stainer
- Born: c. 1618; Hall, Absam, Tyrol
- Died: 1683 (aged 63–64); Absam, Tyrol
- Education: Hanns Grafinger; Niccolò Amati; Vermercati
- Known for: Luthier
- Style: Stainer style
- Movement: Cremonese school; Tyrolean German school
- Spouse: Margarete Holzhammer (m. 1645)
- Elected: Servant of the Archduke (1658–1662); Imperial servant (1669)
- Patrons: Ferdinand Charles; Leopold I
- Website: www.jakob-stainer.de

Jacob Stainer (c. 1618–1683) was the earliest and best known Austrian and Germanic luthier. His violins were sought after by famous 17th- and 18th-century musicians and composers including Johann Sebastian Bach, Wolfgang Amadeus Mozart and George Simon-Lohein. Arcangelo Corelli was one of many who played a Stainer violin.

Stainer was born and died in Absam, in present-day Austria. His designs influenced instrument construction in Germany, the United Kingdom, the Netherlands, parts of Italy, and several other countries.

He may have been associated with the luthiers of Cremona, Italy, in particular the Amati family, and with the Klotz family of violin makers of Mittenwald, Germany. His instruments were the most sought-after throughout Europe until the late 18th century, when changing performance conditions led musicians to seek a different sound.

The instruments of Antonio Stradivari are flatter and broader and produce a more powerful sound than others. This became the sound preferred by musicians as orchestras in large concert halls gradually replaced baroque chamber ensembles in intimate settings.

Stainer's violins are comparatively rare today and few of his violas, cellos, and basses are known to exist. They are highly sought after by musicians who perform early music on period instruments.

== Biography ==
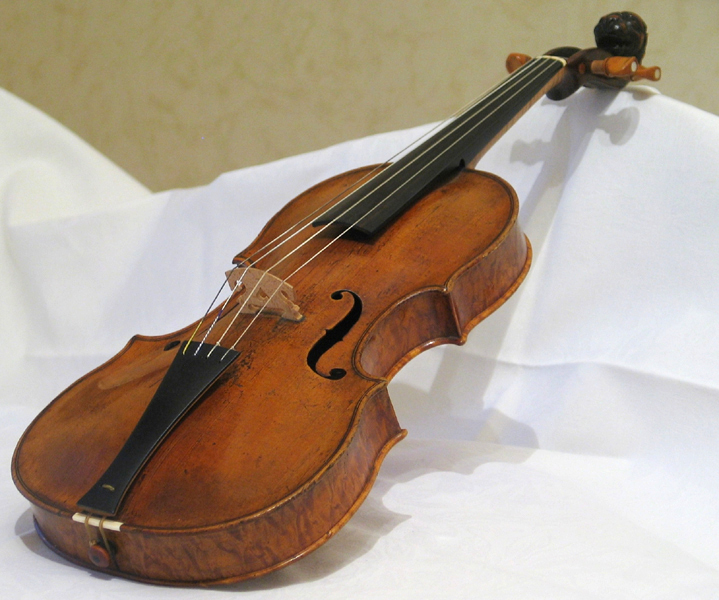
violin by J.Stainer

Jacob Stainer was one of the most famous luthiers of his time in Europe before Stradivari, and the only non-Italian luthier to rank at the top of that artistic craft. Until orchestral music replaced chamber music as the dominant form, Stainer's violins were more sought-after even than Stradivari's. He was born around 1618 in Absam; paternal ancestors were from South Tyrol and the father worked in the salt mines. His mother Barbara Pomberger and her parents, Joachim and Anne Posch, were from Absam. The Stainers lived in Absam in Breitweg near the blacksmith.

Jacob attended the school until 1630, probably learned Latin and spoke Italian. He was sent to Innsbruck to learn the art of organ building with Daniel Hertz, but not being inclined to the work was directed towards the construction of violins. In this field a good knowledge of technical, artistic, drawing, carving and materials is needed. He then completed an apprenticeship in joinery with a relative, Hanns Grafinger. In c.1630 to 1643, he went to Cremona as journeyman to complete his training as a luthier, possibly with Nicolò Amati. Although his name does not appear on the lists of Amati's apprentices, a violin made c.1645 has been cited with an original label at the top block stating: "Jacob Stainer/ fecit Cremona 16.."; perhaps he also went to Venice to work for a short period with Vermercati.

The following year he opened his workshop and married, on 26 November, Margarete Holzhammer, with whom he had eight children. Stainer continued to produce outstanding instruments for court musicians and for the orchestras of the cathedrals of Innsbruck, Salzburg, Munich, Nuremberg, Bozen (Bolzano), Meran (Merano), Brixen (Bressanone) and the court of Spain. In 1656 he achieved success and bought a house, now known as 'House of Jacob Stainer' (German: Stainer-Haus) in which he built his instruments, including the most precious one, preserved at the Tiroler Landesmuseum (Ferdinandeum) Innsbruck.

In 1658 Ferdinand Charles, Archduke of Austria awarded him the honour of 'Servant of the Archduke' until 1662 when the Archduke died. In 1669, Leopold I, Holy Roman Emperor appointed him 'Imperial servant'. The same year he was arrested in Innsbruck, having been found in possession of books concerning Lutheranism, and had to do an act of repentance; between 1670 and 1679 he continued to receive orders from the church. In 1680, probably due to persecution as a heretic, he fell into a manic-depressive syndrome, dying three years later in Absam.

The Cremonese violin-making school

Andrea Amati c. 1505–1577
Antonio Amati c. 1537–1607	Girolamo Amati; 1561–1630
Nicola Amati; 1596–1684
Jacob Stainer c. 1618–1683	Antonio Stradivari; 1644–1737	Girolamo Amati II; 1649–1740	Andrea Guarneri; 1626–1698
F. Stradivari; 1671–1743	O. Stradivari; 1679–1742	Pietro Guarneri; 1655–1720	Giuseppe Guarneri; 1666–c. 1739/40
Giuseppe Guarneri "del Gesu"; 1698–1744	Pietro Guarneri "de Venice"; 1695–1762

- solid lines = Pere-Fils (father to son)
- dashed lines = Maitre-Eleve (master to student)

== Characteristic features of his instruments ==
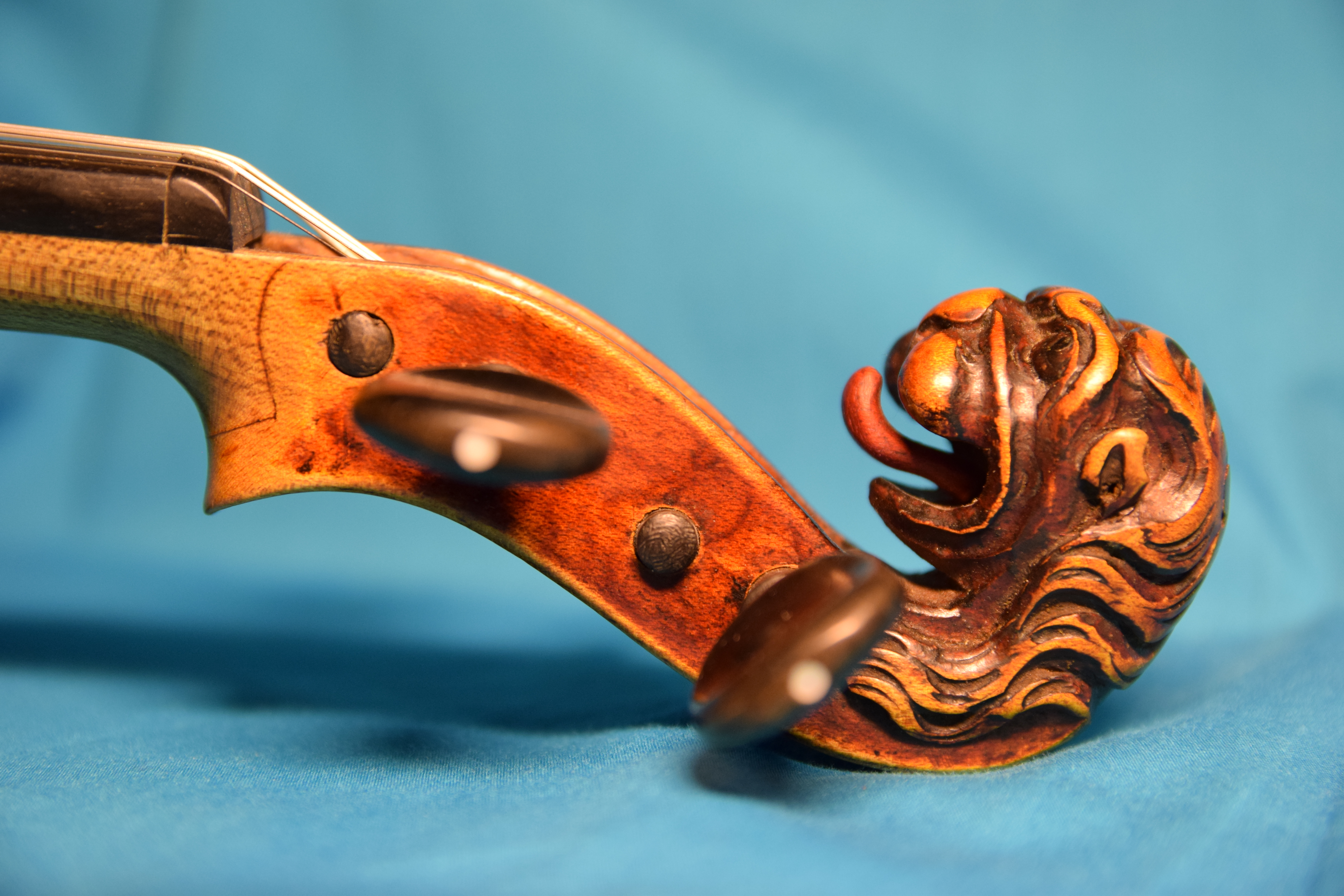
Carved head of lion

- Broad lower back;
- pronounced higher arching of the belly than the back;
- highly skilled craftsmanship, particularly displayed in cut scrolls and occasionally carved heads of lions, angels, or women; and
- varnish ranging in color from amber to orange-red, comparable in brilliance to Cremonese varnish.

== Production ==
Stainer's production can be divided into three distinct periods: the first, including the stay in Italy, from the beginning until 1620, the second until 1667 and the third until his death. The first and the third periods are considered the best, especially for the quality of the instruments produced. Stainer produced a few violas, including a viola di bordone and a viola bastarda, and only a few cellos that are a rarity. Several of his instruments are preserved in museums, including the Tiroler Landesmuseum in Innsbruck and the Lobkowicz Palace in Prague.

Stainer always produced his instruments, more than 300, by himself and never allowed apprentices to create a school in order to hand down his expertise.

== Stainer's label ==
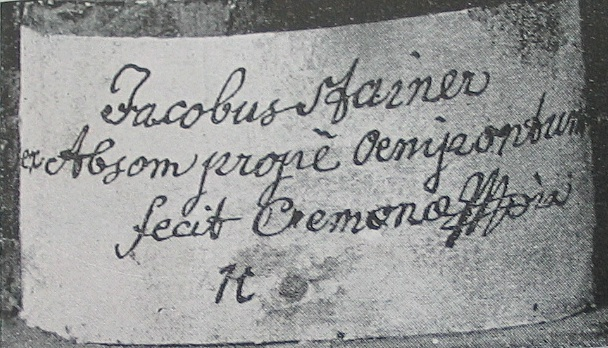

Jacobus Stainer
ex Absam prope Oenipontum
fecit Cremonae

Translation: "Jacob Stainer from Absam near Innsbruck made this in Cremona."

== Recordings made with original string instruments by Stainer ==
- Swiss Chamber Soloists . Bach arranged by Dmitry Sitkovetsky. Goldberg-Variationen. Label: NEOS Classics
