= Zanetto (given name) =

Zanetto is a given name. Notable people with the name include:

- Zanetto Bugatto (1433–1476), Italian portraitist
- Zanetto Micheli (c.1489–after 1560), Italian string instrument maker
