= Don Nicolò Amati =

Italian luthier (1662 - 1752)

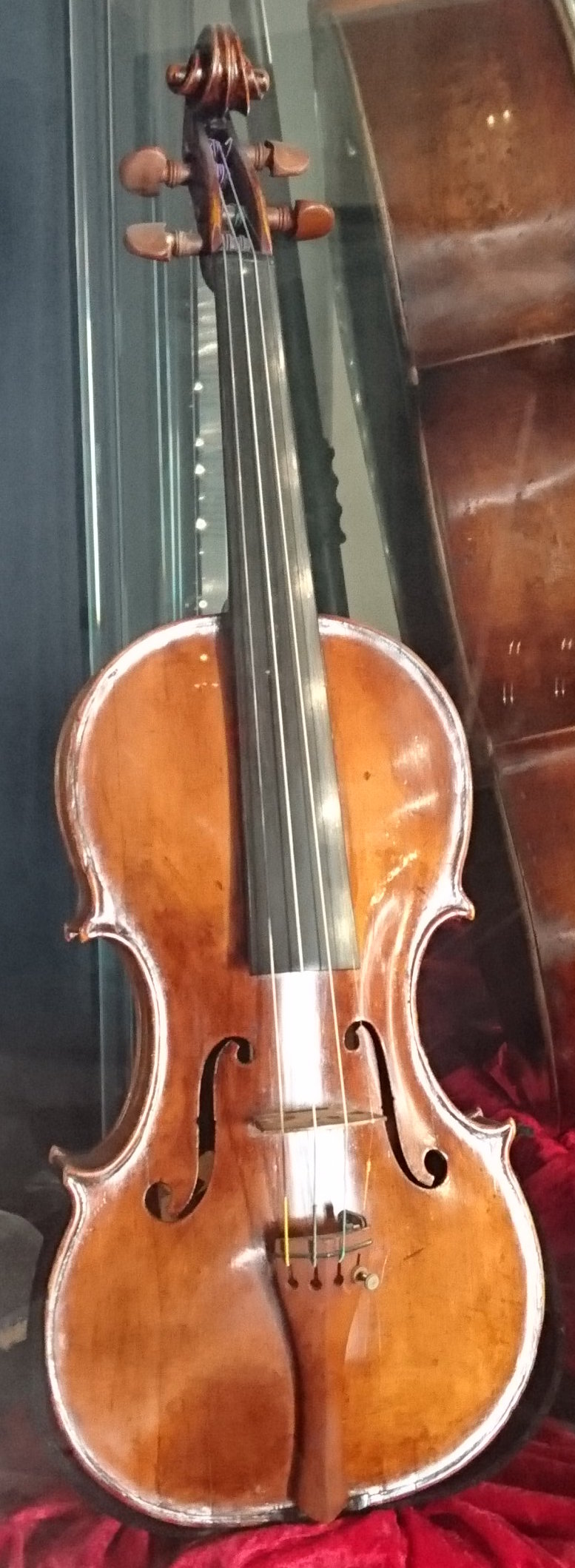
Violin, ca. 1760 from the Artemio Maestro Versari collection

Don Nicolò Amati (born Nicolò Marchioni or Nicolò Melchioni; 1662–1752) was an Italian violin maker based in Bologna. In 1687 he entered priesthood. He pursued both careers, priesthood and violinmaking, throughout his lifetime.

It is assumed that he took the surname "Amati" as a homage to one of the Amatis, the most famous violin-maker family of the time in Bologna, but he was not himself a member.

His violins are considered of varying quality in workmanship, although they are noted for their high-quality varnish.

His workshop was located in the Santi Cosma e Damiano district.
