= Giovanni Battista Rogeri =

Italian luthier (ca. 1642– ca. 1710)

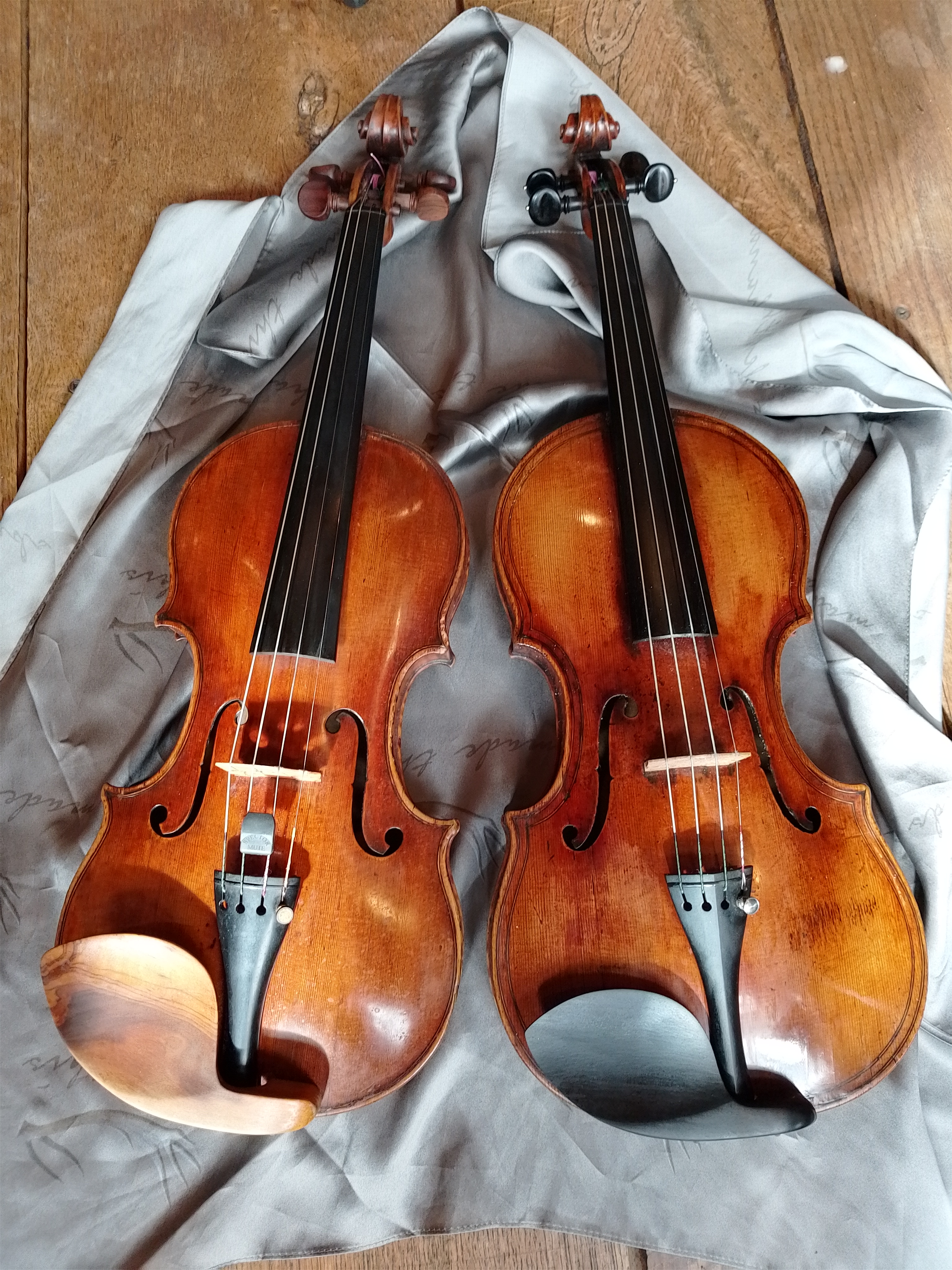
- Born: 1642
- Died: 1710 (aged 67–68)
- Occupation: Luthier

Giovanni Battista Rogeri (ca. 1642 – ca. 1710) was an Italian luthier, who for much of his mature life worked in Brescia. Together with Gasparo da Salò and Giovanni Paolo Maggini, Rogeri was one of the major makers of the Brescian school.

The Rogeri family is not to be confused with the Rugeri family of Cremona, also an important family of violin makers.

== Quotes ==
"Rogeri is believed to have been born in Bologna but moved to Cremona, where he was apprenticed to Nicolo Amati. By 1675 Rogeri had moved again, this time to Brescia. He fused the neatness of construction that he had learned from Amati with the slightly elongated f-holes and C-bouts of his Brescian predecessors, and was able to combine the best elements of the Cremonese and Brescian schools. He reached his peak as a craftsman from about 1690 and his violins based on Amati's Grand Pattern are generally considered his best. By 1690 he was aided by his son Pietro Giacomo, who was a skilled assistant, and no doubt helped with the production of some lesser instruments, which often have unpurfled backs. The Rogeri workshop also produced a number of fine cellos that again demonstrate the benefit of a Cremonese education."--Four Centuries of Violin Making by Tim Ingles (as summarised on Cozio.com)
