= Pellegrino Micheli =

Italian luthier

Pellegrino Micheli da Montechiaro (ca. 1520 – ca. 1606) is one of the most important figures in the early history of the violin. He was one of the first makers of the Brescian school and a contemporary of Gasparo da Salò.

He was born in Montichiari, the son of Zanetto Micheli, and for 65 years he carried out a very long and rich career as a music instrument maker, specializing in strings, learned from Zanetto. He started with violas; then in the 1550s he worked with violins and in the 1570s also in ceteras. The first record of his activity is in 1548, when he was 28 years old. In 1568 he was called "maestro di strumenti da sonar" (master of instrument for playing) a special qualification in common with da Salò that testifies to the variety of the items made by the maker: viols, violas, violones, lyras, double basses, violins, ceteras. The last record is in 1606 where Pellegrino is mentioned like "citharedi". He became a very rich man like da Salò and Costanzo Antegnati. The name has been misunderstood as Pellegrino Zanetto or Zanetto Pellegrino for the fact that in his labels he named himself "Peregrino f(ilius). q(uondam). m(agistro). Zanetto" that means "Pellegrino son of the late Zanetto". Beautiful instruments survive, like the viola da gamba without corners of the MIM, Musée Instrumentale de Musique in Bruxelles; this typical model was used also by Gasparo da Salò for two instruments, one in the Vazquez collection and one in the Vettori collection.
