= Andrea Amati =

Italian luthier (c.1505 – 1577)

- Born: c. 1505; Cremona
- Died: 26 December 1577 (aged 71–72); Cremona
- Occupation: Luthier
- Known for: Credited with constructing the first musical instrument of the modern violin family

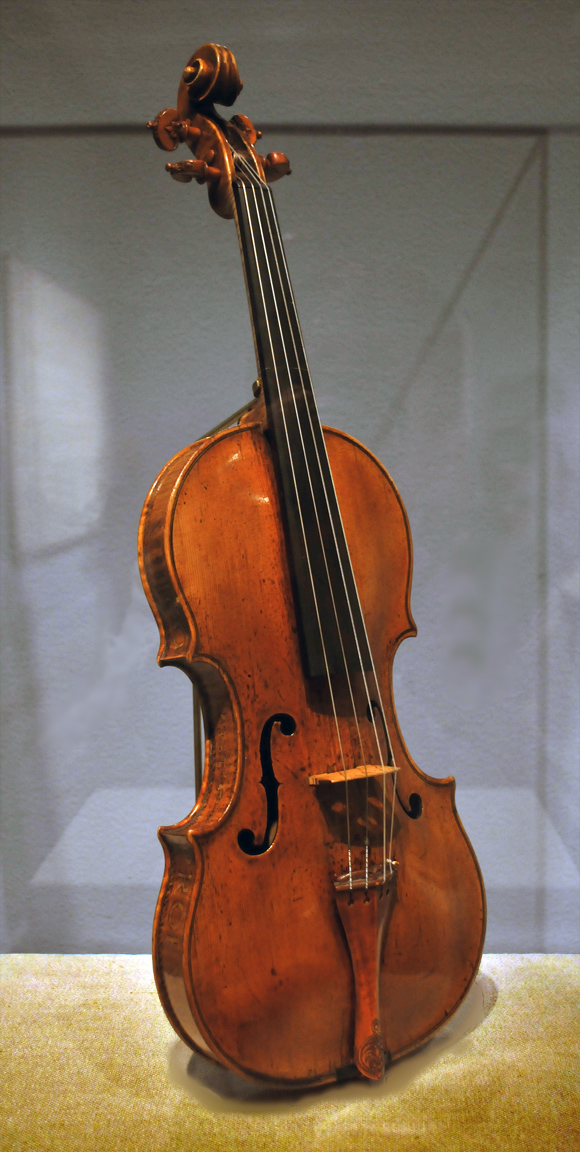
This violin, now at the Metropolitan Museum of Art, may have been part of a set made for the marriage of Philip II of Spain to Elisabeth of Valois in 1559, which would make it one of the earliest known violins in existence.

Andrea Amati (c. 1505 - 1577) was an Italian luthier from Cremona. Amati is credited with making the first instruments of the violin family that are in the form we use today. Several of his instruments survive to the present day, and some of them can still be played. Many of the surviving instruments were among a consignment of 38 instruments delivered to Charles IX of France in 1574.

== Charles IX of France ==
It is estimated that Amati made some 38 instruments between 1560 and 1574 for the Queen Regent of France Catherine de Medici on behalf of her young son, Charles IX of France; one of these was a gilded bass violin, elaborately painted with royal symbols, called The King. There is some uncertainty about the exact date the instrument was crafted; The King's "label" gives the date as 1572, but some scholars have proposed an earlier date. Much of the collection was destroyed during the French Revolution but some pieces were recovered by Giovanni Battista Viotti's student M. J. B. Cartier. It then changed hands several times, first being acquired by the Duport brothers, Jean-Pierre and Jean-Louis. According to the instrument's documentation it was then purchased from Rembert Wurlitzer Co. in 1967 by Lawrence Witten. The King is currently part of the collection at the National Music Museum in Vermillion, South Dakota.

== Role in the development of the modern violin ==
Based on iconographic and literary evidence, the violin can be dated back to 1520. There is no agreement among scholars regarding the development of the early violin. The rebec, fiddle and violoncello are attested to in Gaudenzio Ferrari's frescoes at the church of Saronno and Madonna of the Orange Tree at the church of Vercelli. However, according to Sotheby's:

"There is no surviving identifiable precedent for the exquisitely refined instruments that Amati made to the commission of Charles IX of France and Pope Pius V from about 1566 onward. Technically he may have added a fourth string to a louder, outdoor cousin of the viol that was intended to accompany dance music. Artistically he changed everything."

Sotheby's says "Amati's brilliance raised the status of the violin from a farmhand's entertainment to an embellishment fit for a royal court.

According to a biography by Roger Hargrave, Amati is one of the top candidates scholars have advanced for the inventor of the violin. The two other candidates he named were Gasparo da Salò from Brescia and a luthier born in Füssen / Bavaria, now part of present-day Germany.

The violin-like instruments that existed when Amati began his career only had three strings. Amati is credited with creating the first four stringed violin-like instrument. Laurence Witten also lists Amati and Gasparo' da Salo, as well as Pellegrino de' Micheli, also from Brescia; as well and Ventura di Francesco de' Machetti Linarol, of Venice. Amati's first violins were smaller than modern violins, with high arches, wide purfling, and elegantly curved scrolls and bodies.

Andrea Amati's two sons, Antonio Amati and Girolamo Amati, were also highly skilled violin makers, as was his grandson Nicolò Amati, who had over a dozen highly regarded apprentices, including Antonio Stradivari and Andrea Guarneri.

The Cremonese violin-making school

Andrea Amati c. 1505–1577
Antonio Amati c. 1537–1607 | Girolamo Amati; 1561–1630
Nicola Amati; 1596–1684
Jacob Stainer c. 1618–1683 | Antonio Stradivari; 1644–1737 | Girolamo Amati II; 1649–1740 | Andrea Guarneri; 1626–1698
F. Stradivari; 1671–1743 | O. Stradivari; 1679–1742 | Pietro Guarneri; 1655–1720 | Giuseppe Guarneri; 1666–c. 1739/40
Giuseppe Guarneri "del Gesu"; 1698–1744 | Pietro Guarneri "de Venice"; 1695–1762

- solid lines = Pere-Fils (father to son)
- dashed lines = Maitre-Eleve (master to student)

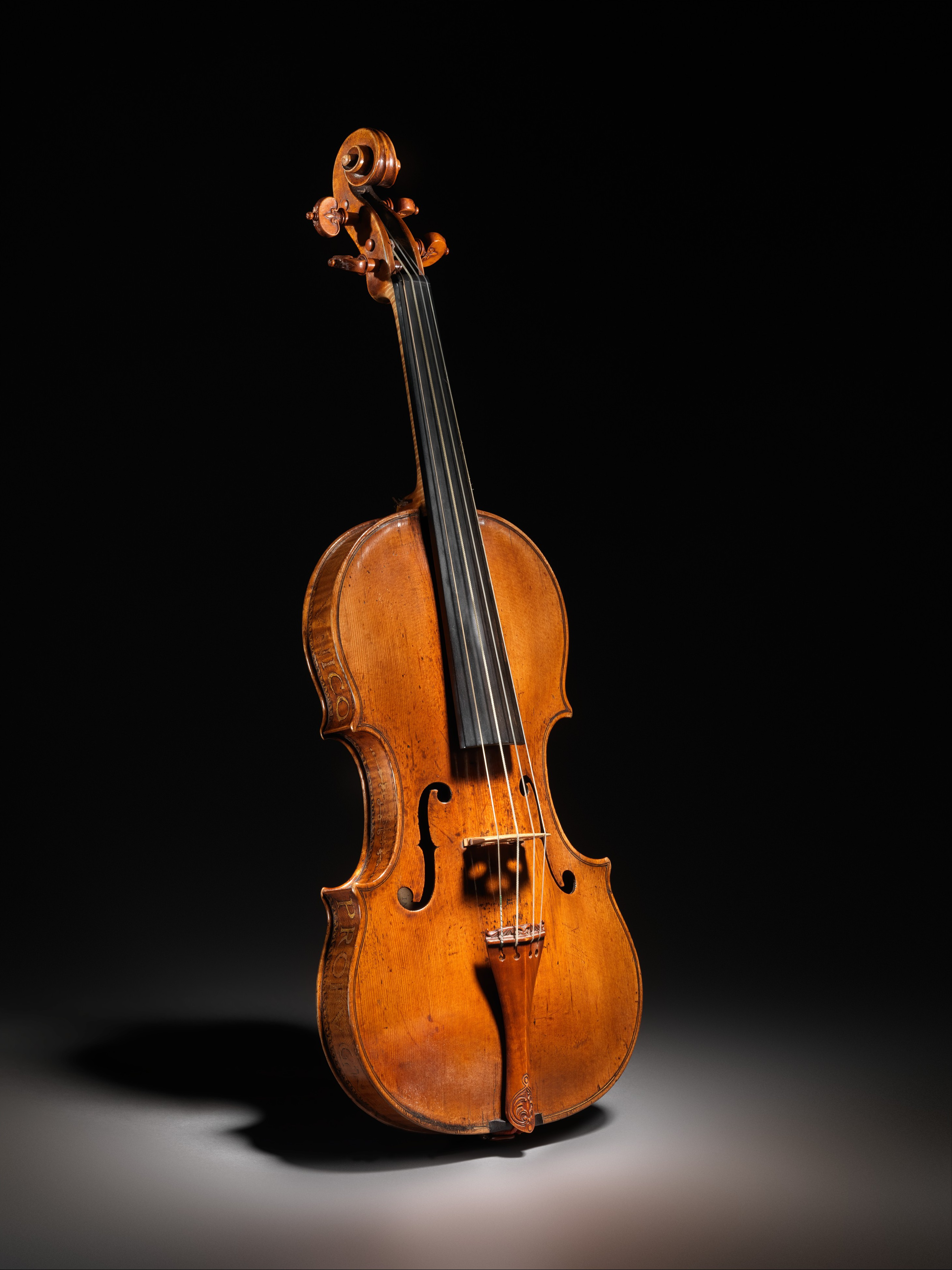
Ex-Kurtz violin at the Metropolitan Museum of Arts (ca. 1560).

== See also ==
- Amati Violas
