= Pasquale Amati =

Italian antiquary (1716–1796)

Pasquale Amati (24 May 1726 – 23 August 1796) was an Italian antiquary, born at Savignano di Romagna (now Savignano sul Rubicone - province of Forlì), and educated at Cesena, Rimini, and Rome. On his return to Savignano he wrote two Dissertazione (Faenza, 1761–63) to prove that the Rubicon was the Savignano river. He also published a Dissertazione sul castro Mutilo degli Antichi Galli e sul Passagio d'Annibale per l'Appennino, at Bologna in 1776.

Appointed to inspect the press at Pesaro, he published a collection of classics, his Biblioteca di Storia Letteraria, 6 vols, 8vo, 1768. However, his best known dissertation is that De Restitutione Purpurarum, in which he investigates the purple dye of the ancients very profoundly. In 1786, he became professor of the Pandects at Ferrara, a position which he retained till his death. He left two sons, both of literary reputation.

== Biography ==
Pasquale Amati studied in Cesena and Rimini, and then moved to Rome, where he studied law with Mattia Costantini. In Rome he also studied ancient letters as well as archaeology and Oriental languages. Upon his return to Savignano he wrote two Dissertations (Faenza, 1761-1763) to prove that the Rubicon was the river of Savignano.

In 1776 he published in Bologna a dissertation on the castle Mutilo of the Gauls and on Hannibal's crossing of the Apennines.

Called by Count Carlo Mosca Barzi to Pesaro to oversee his printing press, he published a collection of classics by Francesco Antonio Zaccaria, the Biblioteca antica e moderna di storia letteraria, 1766-1768.

His best known work is De Restitutione Purpurarum, in which he extensively studied the purple powder used by the ancients.

In 1786, he became professor of Pandette in Ferrara, a chair he held until his death.

== Children ==
- Girolamo Amati (1768–1834), his son
- Basilio Amati (1780–1830), his son
