= Costanzo Antegnati =

Organist, organ builder, and composer (1549–1624)

Costanzo Antegnati (9 December 1549 - 14 November 1624) was an organist, organ builder and composer.

== Biography ==
He was born in Brescia, to a family of prolific organ builders, a profession which also included his father Graziadio. His was musically educated by Giovanni Contino and Girolamo Cavazzoni.

=== Organ builder ===
At age 21, he was sent by his father, who reassured the Duke Guglielmo Gonzaga of his son's abilities, to fix the organ of the basilica of Santa Barbara in Mantua. Additionally, Costanzo worked with his father in the construction of the Antegnati organ, at one time the largest and most famous in the world, which was built in 1581 for the friars of St. Joseph's Church in Brescia.

In 1595 he was commissioned by Catherine Gonzaga, daughter of the Marquis Alfonso Gonzaga, for the construction of the organ at the Church of St. Erasmus Prepositurale in Castel Goffredo. Although few of his instruments survive, the remarkable Organ Antegnati of the church of St. Nicholas (1588) in Bergamo was restored in 1996. He is most famous for the work L'arte organica (1608) which provides technical details of 144 organs built by his family, rules about the tuning of organs and harpsichords, and advice regarding organ registration.

=== Organist and composer ===
Costanzo was an organist at the Brescia cathedral from 1584 until 1619. Despite suffering a stroke sometime near 1600, he continued as principal organist. He was relieved of his duties as organist in 1620 because of his crippled left hand. He was not dismissed from his post and of his salary, as he was deemed "worthy of the city".

He wrote several Masses and madrigals between 1571 and 1592, and published a book of organ pieces, including some of his own, in 1608. In 1571 he published, in Venice, The First Book of Madrigals for Four Voices with a Dialogue for Eight. Subsequently, he published, on an almost biennial basis, anthologies of mainly sacred compositions (Masses, psalms and motets), but also including secular works.

== Antegnati's family tree ==
Lorenzo fl. 1436
Giovanni fl. 1436
Bartolomeo; *~ 1440/46 - †1501
Giovanni Battista; *~1498/00 - †1560/61	Giovanni Giacomo; *~1480/85 †1563	Giovanni Francesco; *~1485/90 - †~1559/64
Graziadio; *1523/25 †1590/91	Benedetto; *~1535 - †1608
Costanzo; *1549 †1624
Giovanni Francesco; *1587 †1630/32
Graziadio; *1608 †1656/57	Faustino; *1611 †1650	Girolamo; *1614 †1650
Bartolomeo Ludovico; *1639 †1691
