= Zanetto Micheli =

Italian luthier

Zanetto Micheli (c. 1489 – after 1560) was the first representative of the oldest known family of string instrument makers from the famous Renaissance Brescian school of strings and violin making, from which many very clear archive documents but (more important) some perhaps 20 original instruments (violins, violas, viols, double basses) seems to survive. Micheli was born in the Italian village of Montichiari and later moved to the nearby town of Brescia. The birth date is deduced from a document of 1550 in which Zanetto declared to be over 60 years old. The oldest record of Micheli is in the 1527 Custodie notturne (Night Guards) with the designation "Ioannettus de li violettis", but without the being described as a "sonator" (player) of that instrument as is in other instances of the documents. Other documents testify to his long and successful career as a "magister" (master) of string instruments. In 1533, he was quoted by Giovanni Maria Lanfranco in his musical and organological treatise Scintille di Musica edited in Brescia in 1533. In 1537 a notarial act is written that Zanetto has to make a consort 5 viols with alla the accessories like the bows and a good varnishing. In almost all of the many documents on his activity, the string instruments are predominant, and the customers of the maker are the most distinguished nobles of Brescia. And more, in the archive documents Zanetto is called "master of violins" like all the other Brescian makers starting surely from 1558. But we have to remember that the word violin appear in Brescia in 1530 and 20 years later il all part of Italy and Europe. Some very rare and good instruments created by Micheli survive in museums and private collections around the world. Some were exhibited at the Maggini exposition in Brescia 2007.

Micheli's son, Pellegrino Micheli, was also an instrument maker.
