= Amati =

Family of Italian violin makers

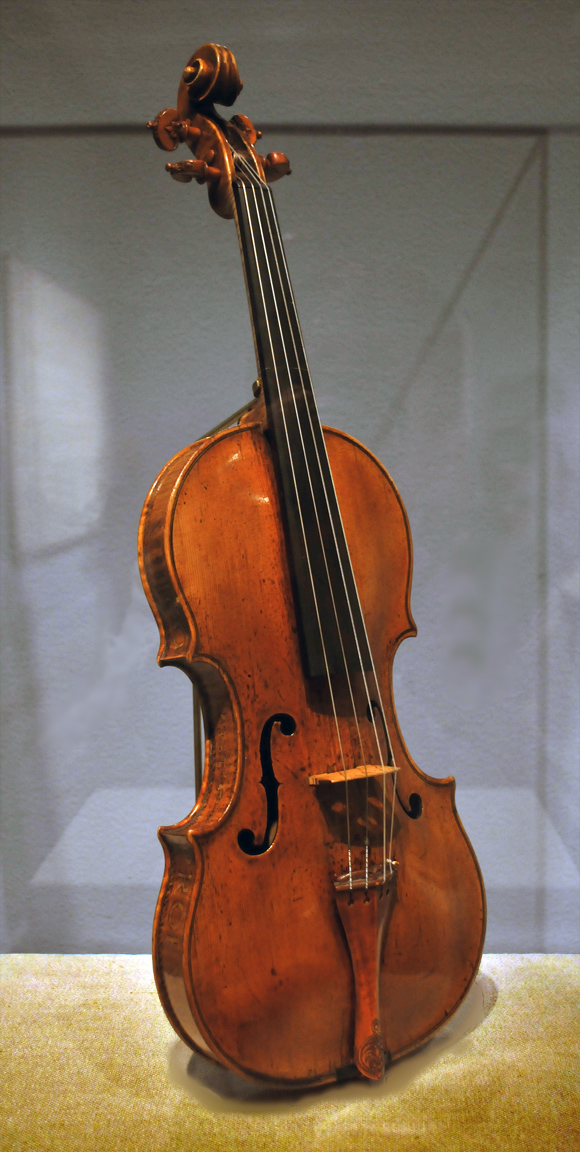
This Andrea Amati violin, now at the Metropolitan Museum of Art, may have been part of a set made for the marriage of Philip II of Spain to Elisabeth of Valois in 1559, which would make it one of the earliest known violins in existence

Amati (/əˈmɑːti/, Italian: [aˈmaːti]) is the surname of a family of Italian violin makers who lived at Cremona from about 1538 to 1740. Their importance is considered equal to those of the Bergonzi, Guarneri, and Stradivari families. Today, violins created by Nicolò Amati are valued at around $600,000. Because of their age and rarity, Amati instruments are mostly kept in museums or private collections and are rarely played in public.

== Family members ==
=== Andrea Amati ===
Andrea Amati (c. 1505 – 20 December 1577) designed and created the violin, viola and cello known as the "violin family". Based in Cremona, Italy, he standardized the basic form, shape, size, materials and method of construction. Makers from nearby Brescia experimented, such as Gasparo da Salò, Micheli, Zanetto and Pellegrino, but it was Andrea Amati who gave the modern violin family their definitive profile.

An assertion that Andrea Amati received the first order for a violin from Lorenzo de' Medici in 1555 is invalid as Lorenzo de' Medici died in 1492. A number of Andrea Amati's instruments survived for some time, dating between 1538 (Amati made the first Cello called "The King" in 1538) and 1574. The largest number of these are from 1560, a set for an entire orchestra of 38 ordered by Catherine de Médicis the regent queen of France and bore hand painted royal French decorations in gold including the motto and coat of arms of her son Charles IX of France. Of these 38 instruments ordered, Amati created violins of two sizes, violas of two sizes and large-sized cellos. They were in use until the French revolution of 1789 and only 14 of these instruments survived. His work is marked by selection of the finest materials, great elegance in execution, soft clear amber, soft translucent varnish, and an in depth use of acoustic and geometrical principles in design.

=== Antonio and Girolamo Amati ===
Andrea Amati was succeeded by his sons Antonio Amati (c. 1537–1607) and Girolamo Amati (c. 1551–1630). "The Brothers Amati", as they were known, implemented far-reaching innovations in design, including the perfection of the shape of the f-holes. They are also thought to have pioneered the modern alto format of viola, in contrast to older tenor violas, but the widespread belief that they were the first ones to do so is incorrect given that Gasparo da Salo (1542–1609) made violas ranging from altos of 39 cm to tenors of 44.7 cm.

=== Nicolò Amati ===
Nicolò Amati (3 December 1596 – 12 April 1684) was the son of Girolamo Amati. Often considered the most eminent violin maker of the family, he improved the model adopted by the rest of the Amatis and produced instruments capable of yielding greater power of tone. His pattern was unusually small, but he also made a wider model now known as the "Grand Amati", which have become his most sought-after violins.

Of his pupils, the most famous were Antonio Stradivari and Andrea Guarneri, the first of the Guarneri family of violin makers. (There is much controversy regarding the apprenticeship of Antonio Stradivari. While the label on Stradivari's first known violin states that he was a pupil of Amati, the validity of his statement is questioned.

=== Girolamo Amati (Hieronymus II) ===
The last maker of the family was Nicolò's son, Girolamo Amati, known as Hieronymus II (26 February 1649 – 21 February 1740). He improved the arching of his father's instruments.

== Extant Amati instruments ==
Amati instruments include some of the oldest extant examples of the violin family, dating to as far back as the mid-16th century. For reasons of conservation, they are only occasionally played in public.

=== United Kingdom ===
Instruments in the UK include Andrea Amati violins from the set delivered to Charles IX of France in 1564.

- Amati instruments at the Ashmolean Museum, Oxford.
- Andrea Amati
  - Violin, 1564 (ex–French royal collection)
  - Viola
- Amati instruments at the Royal Academy of Music Museum, London
- Amati instrument at the Tullie House Museum and Art Gallery, Carlisle
- Andrea Amati
  - Violin, 1564 (ex French royal collection)
- Nicolò Amati
  - Double bass of 1631 played by Chi-chi Nwanoku

=== United States ===
- Amati instruments at the Metropolitan Museum of Art (New York)
  - Andrea Amati:
    - Violin, c. 1560
  - Nicolò Amati:
    - Violin, 1669
- Amati instruments at the National Music Museum (University of South Dakota):
  - Andrea Amati:
    - "The King", circa 1545, the world's oldest extant cello
    - Viola, 1560
    - Violin, 1560
    - Violin, 1574
  - Girolamo Amati:
    - Double bass, 1680
    - Violin, 1604
    - Violin, 7/8-size, 1609
    - Violino piccolo, 1613
  - Nicolò Amati:
    - Violin, 1628

=== Violas ===
==== The Stanley Solomon Tenore ca 1536 ====
Andrea Amati ca 1536

Originally a tenor viola, the front is of pine of slightly wavy grain of medium width. The back is one-piece of maple, slab-cut, slightly flamed but with evident circular decorations. The little scroll is later, but it matches the instrument. The varnish is golden brown.

Measurements (cm)
Length of back	Upper Bout	Middle Bouts	Lower Bouts
43.2	20.6	13.7	24.5

Archivio della Liuteria Cremonese

Tarisio

==== The Witten, The IX Charles, The ex Collis ca 1560 ====
Andrea Amati ca 1560

This rare viola is one of the best preserved of Andrea Amati's decorated instruments. It features gilt paintings of fleurs-de-lis and trefoils on its back, surrounding the monogram identified by Italian scholar Renato Meucci to be that of Marguerite de Valois-Angoulême. The Latin motto painted in gilt around the monogram, as well as around the ribs, is identical to that found on the Museum's Amati violin made at about the same time and may relate to the court of King Philip II of Spain. The loss of some of the mottoes' text, as well as other decorative elements painted on the back, clearly reveals that this instrument was reduced in both length and width from its original, large tenor dimensions.

Measurements (cm)
Length of back	Upper Bout	Middle Bouts	Lower Bouts
40.6	18.5	13.1	23.9

Fine Strings

National Music Museum, The University of South Dakota

National Music Museum, The University of South Dakota

Tarisio

==== From the Charles IX Set ca 1564 ====
Andrea Amati ca 1564

Large tenor viola with Charles IX decoration. Two-piece back of small-figured maple, bearing the royal insignia and motto. Top of pine of varying grain. Original scroll. Golden-brown varnish. Label not original: "Andrea Amadi in Cremona M. D. L. xxiiij." (1574).

Measurements (cm)
Length of back	Upper Bout	Middle Bouts	Lower Bouts
46.9	22.5	15.1	26.9

Tarisio

Tarisio

==== Held at the Ashmolean Museum Oxford ====
Andrea Amati ca 1564

Ashmolean Museum Oxford

==== The ex Wahl ca 1568 ====
Andrea Amati ca 1568

Two-piece back with an ebony inlay of "Chinese-knot" design. Scroll not original. Label not original, dated 1568.

Measurements (cm)
Length of back	Upper Bout	Middle Bouts	Lower Bouts
42.7	21	14	25.1

Strings Magazine

Tarisio

==== The ex Herrmann ca 1620 ====
Antonio & Girolamo Amati ca 1620

Northern Italian viola attributed to Andrea Amati. Made, in our opinion, circa 1620 by a member of the Amati school. The head by another maker. The back is from one piece of slab cut maple with faint irregular flames. The sides are from slab cut maple similar to the back. The scroll is from quarter cut maple with faint narrow flames. The top is from two pieces of spruce with medium and narrow grain. The dimensions are somewhat reduced. The varnish has a golden brown color. Labelled "ANDREAS AMATIUS CREMONA 1567".

Measurements (cm)
Length of back	Upper Bout	Middle Bouts	Lower Bouts
40.9	18.6	13.4	23.2

Christie's

Featured in Riley 1980.

==== The Violetta ca 1570 ====
Andrea Amati ca 1570

Two-piece back. The painted decoration is the coat of arms of the Spanish crown. Top with two small wings in the lower bouts. Scroll not original. Labeled "Niccolaus & Antonius Fratres Amati, Cremonem Fes...1649."

Measurements (cm)
Length of back	Upper Bout	Middle Bouts	Lower Bouts
39.5	19	13.3	23.4

Tarisio

==== The Trampler ca 1580 ====
Antonio & Girolamo Amati ca 1580–90

This instrument was cut down in size around 1800 from an original length of about 47 cm. The ribs are painted with the inscription: "Non AEtesin Homine sed Virtus Consideramus".

Although the instrument comes with a certificate from Simone F. Sacconi attributing it to the Brothers Amati circa 1620, both Charles Beare and Jacques Francais believe it to be a work of Andrea Amati, possibly completed by the Brothers Amati, in which case its date would be closer to 1580.

Measurements (cm)
Length of back	Upper Bout	Middle Bouts	Lower Bouts
44.4	21.6	15.2	27.6

Tarisio

Featured in Riley 1980.

==== The Henry IV ca 1590 ====
Girolamo Amati ca 1590

One-piece back, covered with a painting of the armorial bearings of Henry IV supported on each side by an angel. Top of spruce with an open and well-defined grain. Scroll: of faint narrow curl. Ribs of wood similar to back, inscribed in gilt letters "Dvo Proteci Tvnvs". Red-brown varnish.

Measurements (cm)
Length of back	Upper Bout	Middle Bouts	Lower Bouts
42.2	20	12.9	24.3

Tarisio

Featured in Riley 1980.

==== The Crocfisso, The Medecia ca 1594 ====
Antonio & Girolamo Amati, ca 1594

Commissioned for the Medici family, known as the 'Viola Medicea' or the 'Viola del Crocifisso' after the crucifix decoration on its back.

The Strad

==== The Stauffer ca 1615 ====
Antonio & Girolamo Amati ca 1615

One-piece back of medium curl sloping from left to right. Top of distinct grain, broadening slightly towards the flanks. Scroll of wood similar to back. Ribs of wood similar to back. Golden-brown varnish. Labeled "Antonius & Hieronymus Fr. Amati Cremonen. Andreæ fil. F 1615."

Measurements (cm)
Length of back	Upper Bout	Middle Bouts	Lower Bouts
41.1	19.6	12.9	24.6

Tarisio

==== The Zukerman, The Kashkashian ca 1617 ====
Antonio & Girolamo Amati ca 1617

Two-piece back. Dendrochronology report by Peter Ratcliff dates the youngest ring of bass and treble sides as 1613.

Measurements (cm)
Length of back	Upper Bout	Middle Bouts	Lower Bouts
40.6	20.2	14.1	25.5

Tarisio

==== Held by the Cincinnati Art Museum ca 1619 ====
Antonio & Girolamo Amati ca 1619

Measurements (cm)
Length of back	Upper Bout	Middle Bouts	Lower Bouts
41.7	19.6	13.1	24.3

Cincinnati Art Museum

==== The Medici, The Hamma ca 1619 ====
Antonio & Girolamo Amati ca 1619

Two-piece back.

Tarizio

==== Held by the Royal Academy of Music London ca 1620 ====
Antonio & Girolamo Amati ca 1620

One of the few surviving tenors which has not been reduced in size for modern playing. The head is particularly beautiful and well proportioned. The cheeks are flat, in the style of a cello head, although not so wide as to obstruct the player's left hand. The long and elegant pegbox tapers to a wide throat beneath the perfectly carved scroll. The volutes are hollowed and gather depth from the second through to the narrow final turn. The figured quarter-sawn maple used for the back and sides of the instrument is of a type commonly used by the Amatis. The continuous slope of the flame across the centre joint (achieved by reversing one half of the back before jointing), rather than the mirror-image pattern most commonly seen, is also a feature of their work. The front is of straight and even close-grained spruce.

Measurements (cm)
Length of back	Upper Bout	Middle Bouts	Lower Bouts
45.0	21.3	14.4	26.1

Royal Academy of Music London

Tarisio

==== The ex Wittgenstein ca 1620 ====
Antonio & Girolamo Amati ca 1620

Two-piece back; the wax seal below the button depicts a woman's head. Top of narrow grain, widening towards the flanks. Scroll of wood similar to back. Ribs of wood similar to back. Golden-brown varnish. Labeled "Antonio & Hieronimus Fr. Amati / Cremonen Andrea F 1620."

Measurements (cm)
Length of back	Upper Bout	Middle Bouts	Lower Bouts
43.0	19.6	13.1	24.3

Tarisio

Ingles & Hayday

==== Held in the Galleria Estense Modena ca 1625 ====
Girolamo Amati ca 1625

Labelled "Antonius, & Hieronymus, Fr. Amati Cremonen. Andrae fil. F.1620" (not original).

Back of maple. Top of spruce with a pronounced, rather wide grain. Ribs of the same maple as the back.

Measurements (cm)
Length of back	Upper Bout	Middle Bouts	Lower Bouts
40.9	19.5	12.7	24.3

The subject of the book The Girolamo Amati viola in the Galleria Estense, Treasures of Italian Violin Making Vol I, 2014

==== The ex Vieuxtemps ====
Nicolò Amati, date unknown

Tarisio

Nicolo Amati ca 1663

Two-piece spruce top of medium width grain widening to the edges, two-piece back of quarter sawn maple with faint flame of narrow width mostly horizontal, ribs and scroll of similar maple, and varnish of an orange-brown color over a golden ground. There is an original printed label inside the instrument reads "Nicolaus Amatus Cremonen. Hieronymi Fil. ac Antonij Nepos Fecit. 1663"

National Museum of American History

==== The Berkitz, The Romanov ca 1677 ====
Nicolò Amati ca 1677

Tariso

The Strad Shop

The Strad Shop

==== The ex Waters ca 1703 ====
Nicolò Amati ca 1703

Toronto Symphony Orchestra (subscription required)

Toronto Symphony Orchestra

==== The ex Francais 1708 ====
Girolamo Amati II ca 1708

Two-piece back of small curl. Top of pine of well-defined and rather open grain. Scroll of less pronounced curl. Ribs of less pronounced curl. Golden-brown varnish. Labeled "Hieronymus Amatus Cremonen Nicolai figlius fecit 1708."

Measurements (cm)
Length of back	Upper Bout	Middle Bouts	Lower Bouts
43.9	21.9	13.8	25.7

Tarisio

==== Other Amati violas in the Tarisio archive ====
- Antonio & Girolamo Amati ca 1592
- Antonio & Girolamo Amati ca 1607
- Antonio & Girolamo Amati ca 1611
- Antonio & Girolamo Amati ca 1616
- Antonio & Girolamo Amati ca 1619
- Antonio & Girolamo Amati ca 1619
- Antonio & Girolamo Amati ca 1619
- Antonio & Girolamo Amati ca 1620
- Antonio & Girolamo Amati ca 1620
- Antonio & Girolamo Amati ca 1628

== In popular culture ==
- Patrick O'Brian's fictional British sea captain Jack Aubrey is described as owning a "fiddle far above his station, an Amati no less", in The Surgeon's Mate. In the Wine-Dark Sea, book fifteen of the series, Stephen Maturin now has a Girolamo Amati and Aubrey a Guarneri.
- In Satyajit Ray's short story Bosepukure Khoonkharapi, the fictional detective Feluda deduces that a character was murdered because he owned an Amati violin.
- In the manga and anime series Gunslinger Girl, Henrietta carries an Amati violin case. It contains a Fabrique Nationale P90 when on a mission, otherwise it contains a real violin.
- On the radio show, Yours Truly, Johnny Dollar, the January 1956 episode "The Ricardo Amerigo Matter" centered on a stolen Amati violin.
- In the 2022 Cormac McCarthy novels, The Passenger and Stella Maris, Alicia Western purchases an Amati violin for more than $200,000 while she is in her mid- to late teens, paying in cash from money she inherited. In Stella Maris, she relates this to her psychiatrist while in a psychiatric hospital, describing the details of the purchase and some history of the Amati instruments. McCarthy, C., The Passenger and Stella Maris, New York: Knopf (2022).

== See also ==
- Antonio Stradivari
- Amati Quartet
- Dom Nicolò Amati (1662–1752), Italian luthier not part of this family but who adopted this surname
- Luthier
- San Maurizio, Venice
