= Nicola Amati =

Italian master luthier (1596–1684)

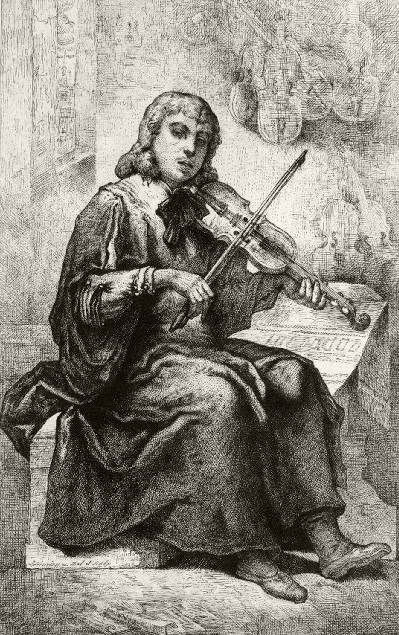
- Born: 3 December 1596; Cremona
- Died: 12 April 1684 (aged 87); Cremona
- Resting place: Cremona Cathedral
- Education: Girolamo 'Hieronymus' Amati; Antonio 'Antonius' Amati
- Known for: Luthier
- Notable work: Alard (1649); Brookings (1654); King Louis XIV (1656); Hammerle (1658)
- Style: Amati style; Nicola Amati style
- Movement: Cremonese school
- Spouse: Lucrezia Pagliari (m. 1645; died 1684)

Nicola Amati, Nicolò Amati or Nicolao Amati (/əˈmɑːti/, Italian: [niˈkɔːla aˈmaːti, nikoˈlɔ -, nikoˈlaːo -]; 3 December 1596 – 12 April 1684) was an Italian master luthier from Cremona, Italy. Amati is one of the most well-known luthiers from the Casa Amati (House of Amati). He was the teacher of illustrious Cremonese School luthiers such as Andrea Guarneri and Giovanni Battista Rogeri. While no clear documentation exists for their being apprentices in his shop, Amati may also have apprenticed Antonio Stradivari, Francesco Rugeri, and Jacob Stainer, as their work is heavily influenced by Amati.

== Early life ==
Nicola Amati was the fifth son of Girolamo Amati (Hieronymus I, b.1561; d.1630) from his second wife, and the grandson of Andrea Amati. He was one of 12 children of Girolamo. Amati's mother, Laura de Lazzarini, also known as Laura de Medici de Lazzarini, was the daughter of Giovanni Francesco Guazzoni. They were distantly related to the Florentine Medici family.

The 1629–31 Italian plague affected northern and central Italy, including Cremona. In 1630, the plague killed Amati's father, mother and two of his sisters. After his parents' death, he lived with his sister until his marriage.

== Career ==
=== Apprenticeship ===
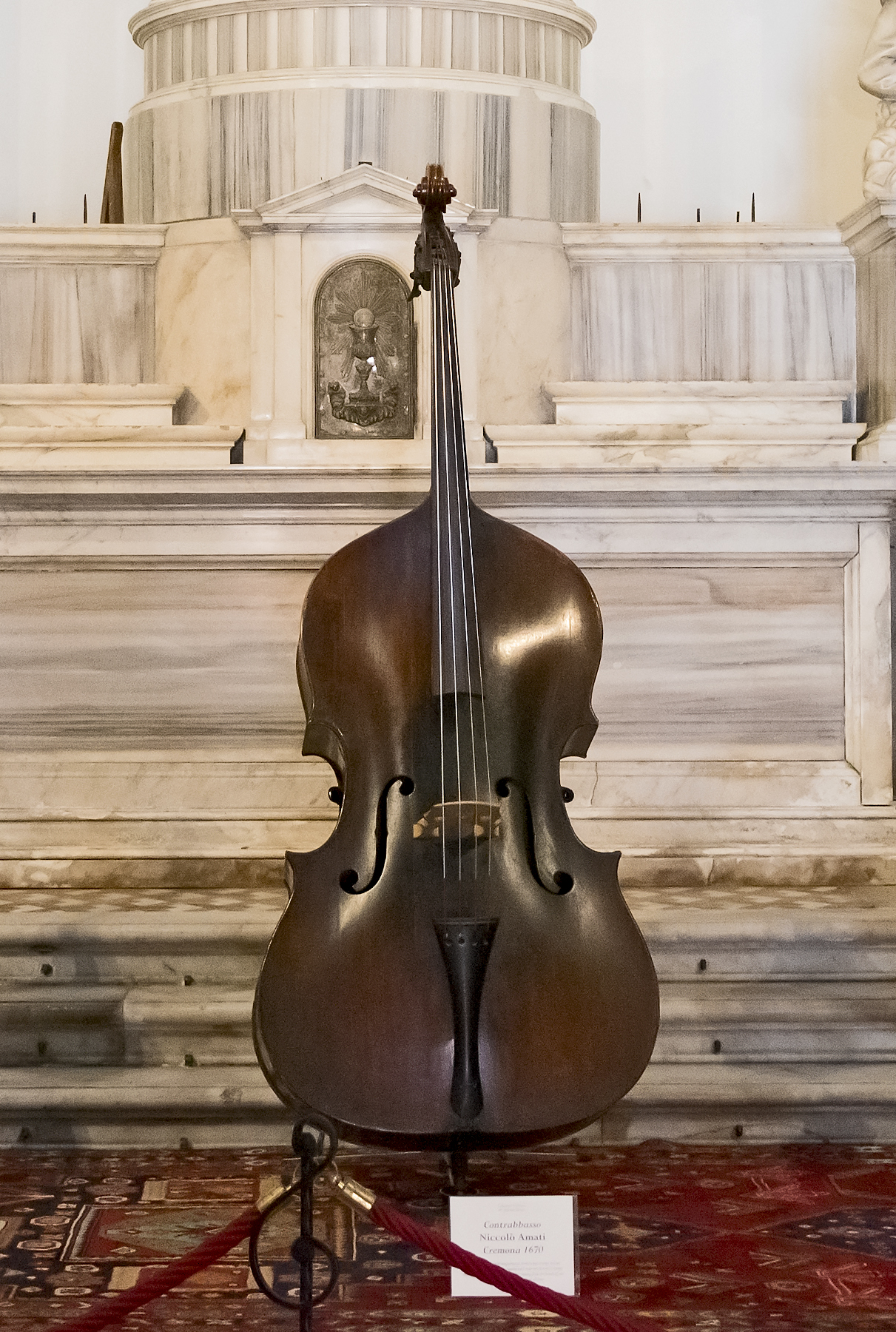
1670 Nicola Amati Double bass

Nicola probably apprenticed with his father and uncle. By the 1620s, Nicola was the dominant luthier in the Amati workshop.

=== Amati style ===
Of all the Amati Family violins, those of Nicola are often considered most suitable for modern playing. As a young man his instruments closely followed the concepts of his father's, with a relatively small model and high arch rising nearly to a ridge in the centre of both the front and back of the instrument.

The Latin forms of the first names, Andreas, Antonius, Hieronymus, and Nicolaus, were generally used on the violin labels, and the family name was sometimes Latinized as Amatus.

=== Nicola Amati style ===
Beginning in 1630, he gradually began to show signs of originality, which by 1640 were expressed in what is now known as the "Grand Amati Pattern". This Grand Pattern was slightly larger, the backs being up to 35.6 cm (about 14 inches) long, and most notably, up to 20.9 cm (about 8 1/4 inches) wide, allowed a larger sound. Well curved, long-cornered, and strongly and cleanly purfled, these instruments represent perhaps the height of elegance in violin making, and were characterized by mathematically derived outlines and transparent amber-colored varnish. The Grand Amati style was the inspiration for other Cremonese makers such as Vincenzo Rugeri and early violins by Antonio Stradivari.

=== Distinguished apprentices ===
After the 1629-1631 Italian plague virtually wiped out all the luthiers of Cremona and Brescia, Nicola singlehandedly continued the local tradition of violin making. Demand for musical instruments began to increase in the 1640s, causing him to be one of the first to take apprentices from outside his family into his workshop. Andrea Guarneri, who eventually founded the Guarneri Family of violin makers, was Amati's pupil.

Francesco Rugeri may have been a pupil of Nicola Amati, however, like Antonio Stradivari, census records also fail to mention his name in the census of the Amati household. The lack of census records showing the Rugeri name may be explained by the possibility of Francesco not being an indoor apprentice, but one who lived and boarded at his own home while apprenticing. Francesco occasionally inserted his labels in his instruments stating he was a pupil of Nicola Amati. For example, there exists a violin labelled "Francescus Rugerius Alumnus Nicolai Amati fecit Cremonæ 1663". Nicolò Amati was the godfather to Francesco's son, Giacinto, indicating that the two families at least shared a close relationship and close collaboration would seem likely.

Antonio Stradivari was likely a pupil of Nicola, although evidence is scarce. For instance, dendrochronology of the soundboard on a surviving Stradivarius harp from 1681 shows that it was made from the same tree trunk as an Amati cello made in 1679. The only documentary evidence is one Antonio Stradivari label dated 1666, which reads, "Alumnus Nicolais Amati" - student of Nicolò Amati. It has always been controversial whether he was an actual apprentice of Nicola Amati or merely considered himself a student and admirer of his work. There are important discrepancies between their work. Some researchers believe early instruments by Stradivari bear a stronger resemblance to Francesco Rugeri's work than Amati's. Additionally, the utilization of a small dorsal pin or small hole, invariably used not just by Nicolò Amati but all of his confirmed pupils—with the exception of Antonio Stradivari, adds further evidence that Stradivari may have learnt his craft apart from Amati. This pin or hole was fundamental in the graduation of the thickness of the plates and was obviously a technique passed on through generations of pupils of the Amati. This dorsal pin is also not found in any of the instruments of the Rugeri family, suggesting Antonio Stradivari may have actually learnt his craft from Francesco Rugeri, although both being influenced by Amati. W.E. Hill & Sons concede that they fail to find the hand of Stradivari in any of Nicolo Amati's work, although the unmistakable hands of Andrea Guarneri and Francesco Rugeri are evident.

Other documented pupils of Amati include: Giovanni Battista Rogeri, Matthias Klotz, Jacob Railich, Bartolomeo Pasta, Bartolomeo Cristofori, Giacomo Gennaro, Giacomo 'Tedesco' (meaning 'German' and probably a nickname), Giacomo Reilich, Giovanni Segher (or Jaeger), and Amati's son, Hieronymus II (often referred to in English as Girolamo).

=== Retirement as luthier ===
Nicola ceased being actively involved in violin manufacturing by the end of 1670. Increasingly the handwork of his son, Hieronymus II, is seen on Amati instruments. Amati died on 12 April 1684, aged 87.

== Personal life ==
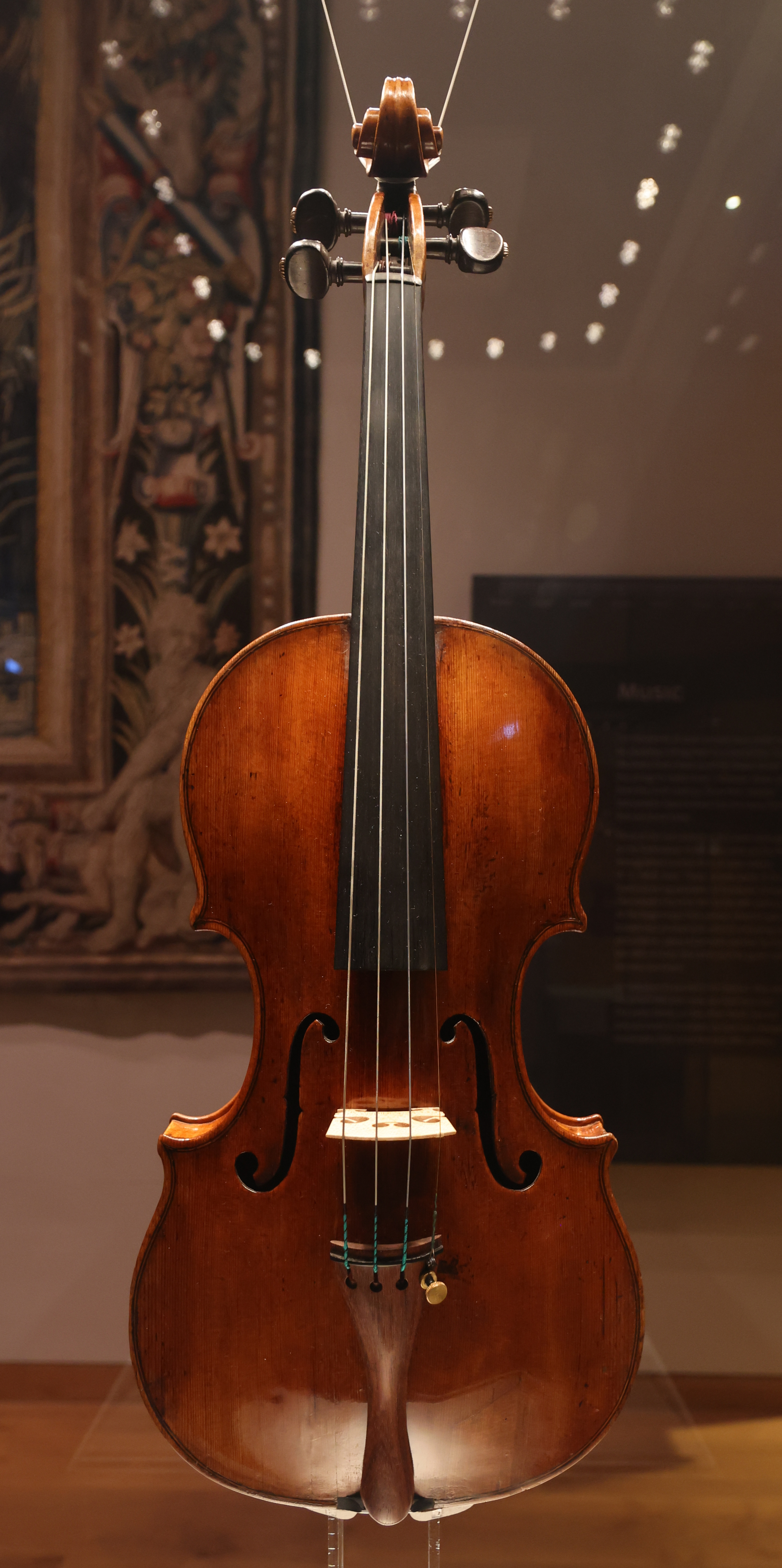
A Nicola Amati violin dating from the 1640s

Amati married Lucrezia Pagliari (d. 26 November 1703) on 23 May 1645. His pupil, Andrea Guarneri, was present at the ceremony and signed the register. Nicolo and Lucrezia had four sons and four daughters. Their son Girolamo Amati (Hieronymus II, b. 1649; d. 1740) (known as Girolamo II) was the family's last luthier.

Amati died on 12 April 1684, aged 87, in Cremona, Italy.

== Performers with Nicolo Amati instruments ==
Amati's instruments are very rare and most of them are on display in museums around the world. Museums with his work on display, include the Metropolitan Museum of Art in New York, Museo del Violino in Cremona and the Royal Academy of Music Museum in London.

However, there are a few performers who have played with Nicola instruments, Thomas Bowes plays a Nicola Amati violin, and Chi-chi Nwanoku (OBE) plays an Amati double-bass.

== Instrument list ==
(From the Cozio Archive)

- the 'Hambourg' 1641, Cozio 46038 - played by Frances Magnes
- the 'Ole Bull' 1647, Cozio 48649
- the 'Francais' 1647, Cozio 48781
- the 'Partello' 1648, Cozio 40877
- the 'Georgie Stoll' c. 1648, Cozio 18796
- the 'Alard' 1649, Cozio 40103
- the 'Brookings' 1654, Cozio 40441
- the 'Krasner, Voute', Cozio 47111
- the 'King Louis XIV, Youssoupov, Panajeff, Medici' 1656, Cozio 42580
- the 'Paganini' 1657, Cozio 43781
- the 'Kaiser' 1657, Cozio 48782
- the 'Hämmerle' 1658, Cozio 42363
- the 'Kempner' 1662, Cozio 45581
- the 'Count Pergen' 1663, Cozio 40164
- the 'Gillott, Woolworth' 1664, Cozio 49275
- the 'Antoinette' 1666, Cozio 41434
- the 'Baron Knoop' 1666, Cozio 60433
- the 'Réthi', c. 1669, Cozio 42950
- the 'Corcoran' 1671, Cozio 48785
- the 'Professor Florian Zajic' 1672, Cozio 42791
- the 'Voigt' 1682, Cozio 49281
- the 'Spagnoletti' 1682, Cozio 46565
- the 'Spagnoletti' 1683, Cozio 31738
- the 'Professor Wirth' 1663, Cozio 42792
- the 'Berkitz' 1677, Cozio 49362
- the 'Vatican Stradivari', Cozio 49233
- the 'Willeke' 1642, Cozio 43994
