= Gasparo da Salò =

Italian violin maker and double bass player (1542 - 1609)

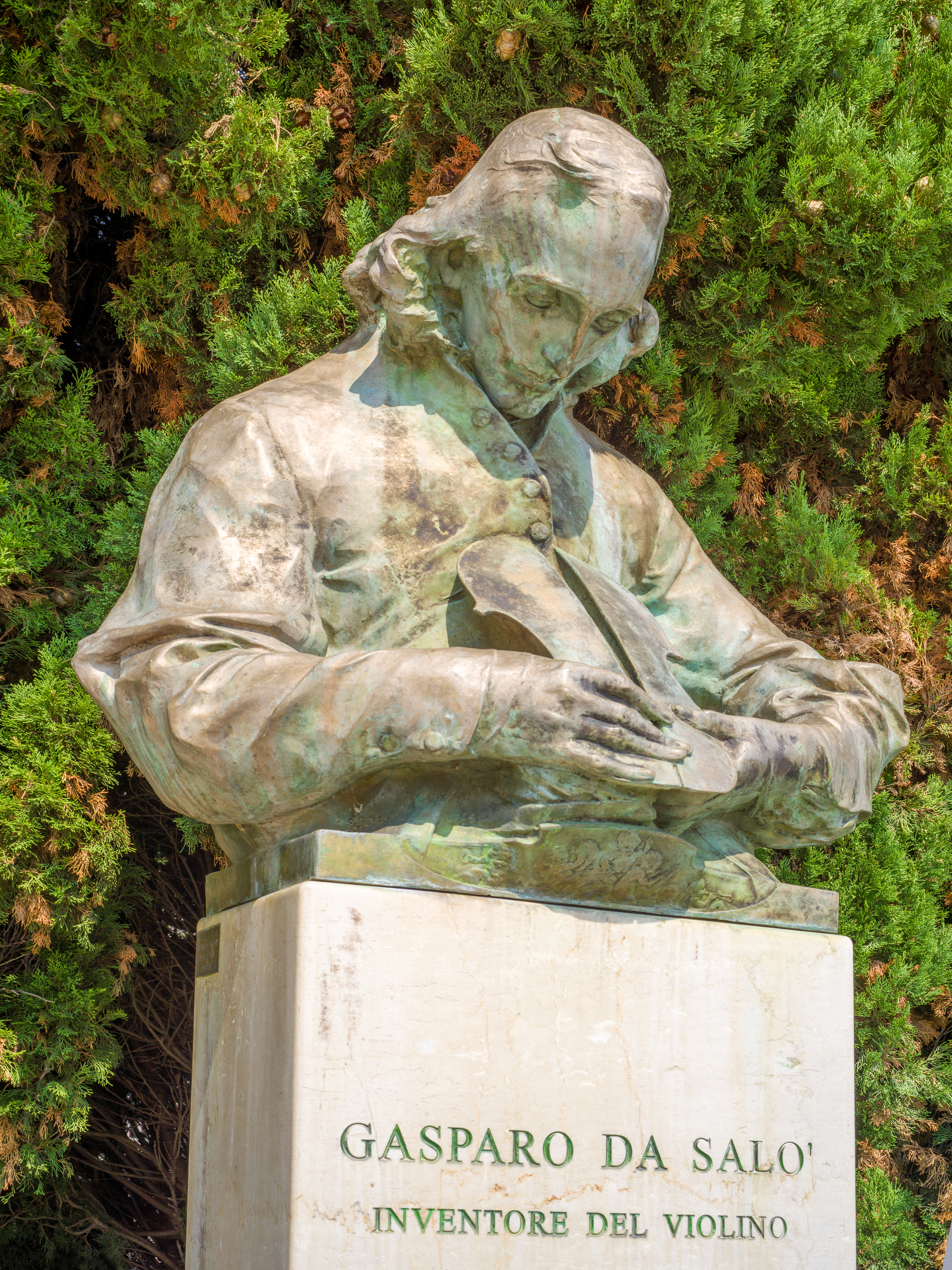
Statue of Gasparo Da Salò

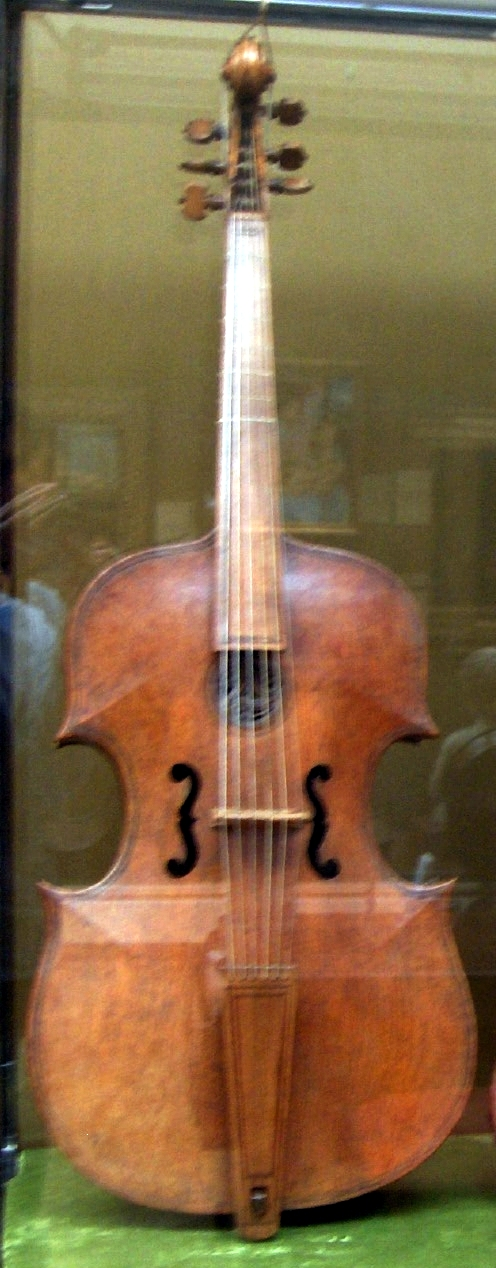
Bass viol (Ashmolean Museum)

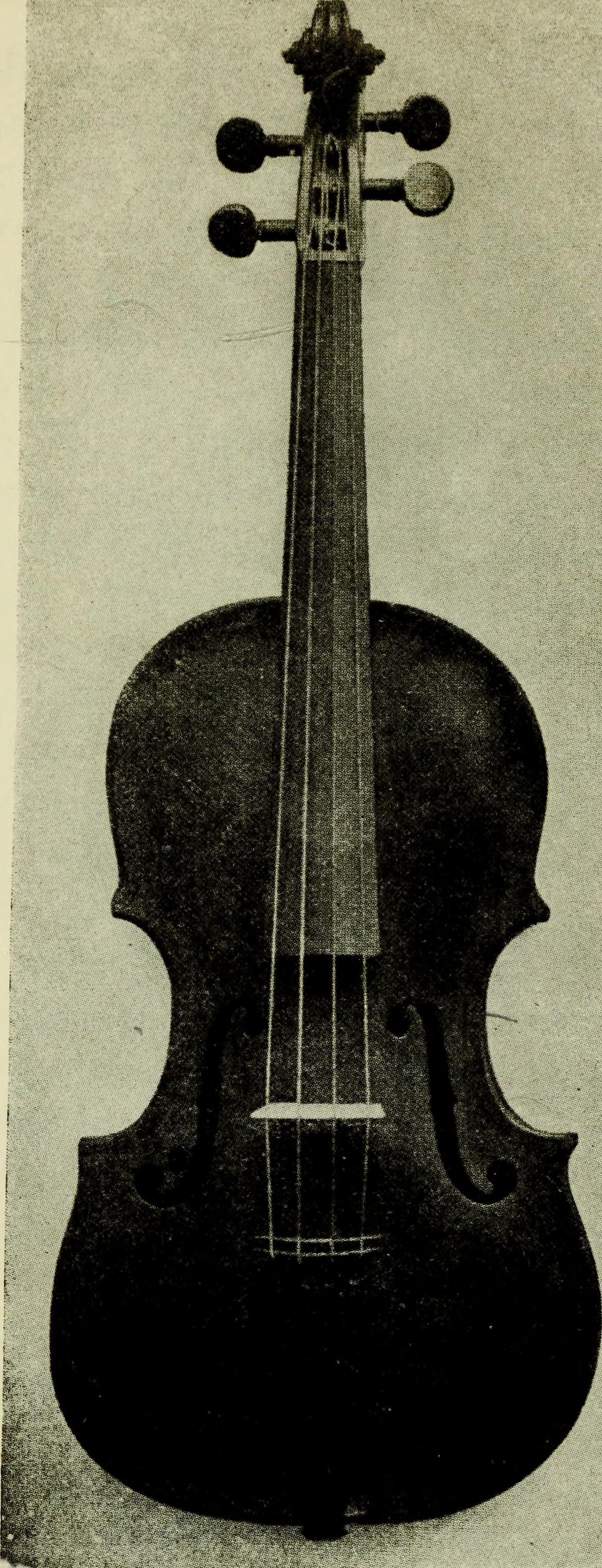
Violin (Esther 1917)

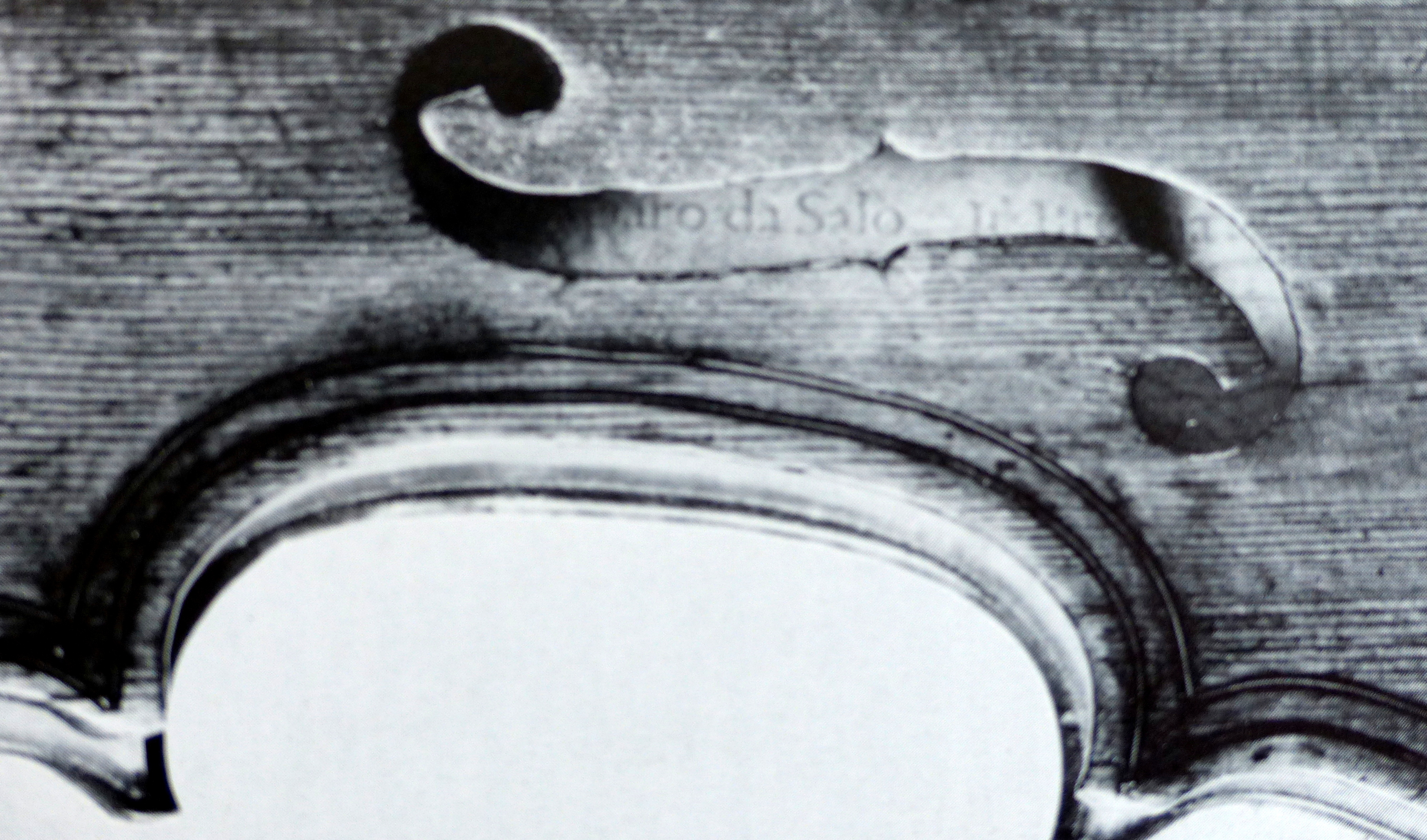
F-hole label on Viola

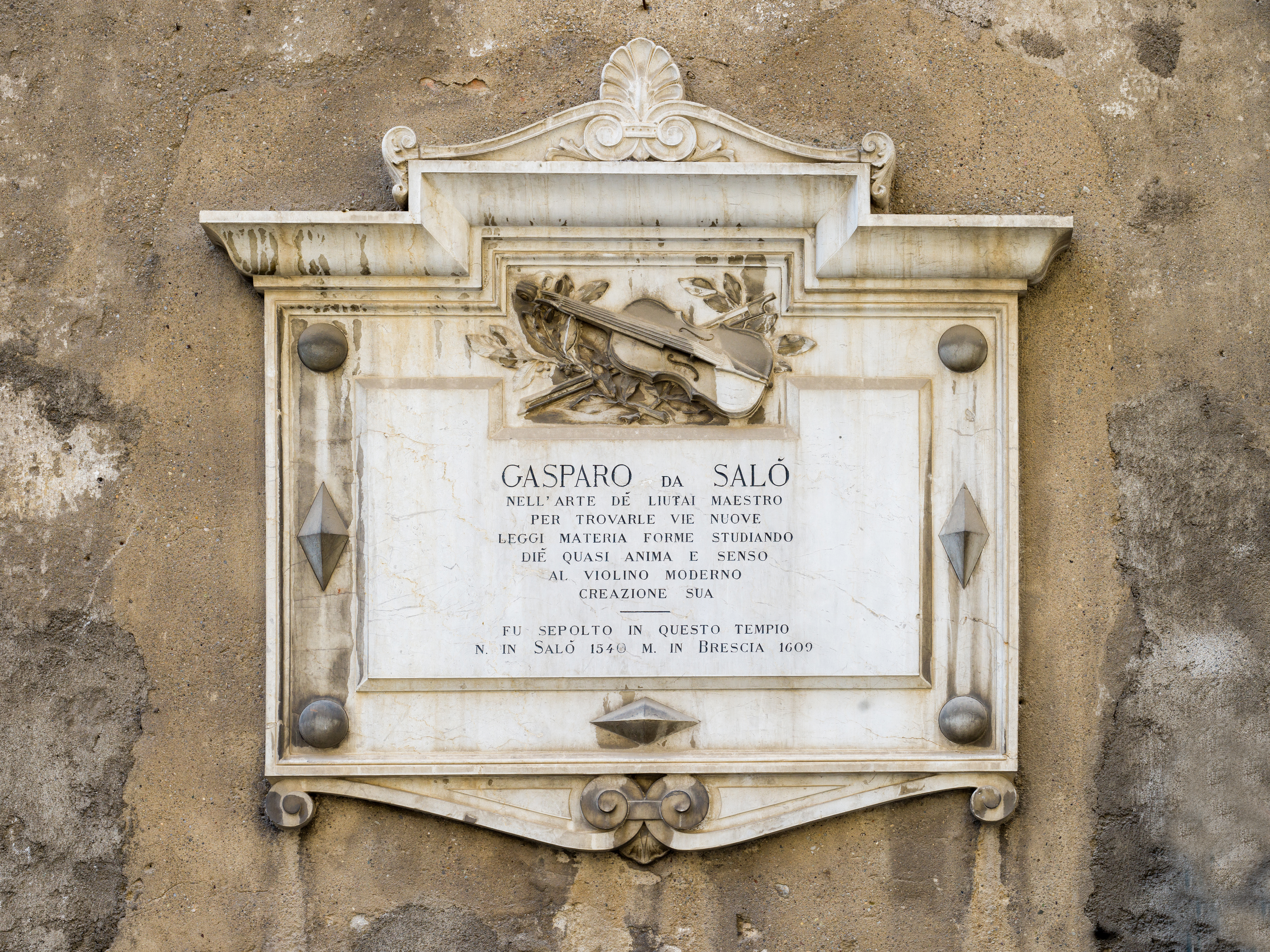
Commemorative plaque at Church of San Giuseppe in Brescia.

Gasparo da Salò (20 May 1542 – 14 April 1609) is the name given to Gasparo Bertolotti, one of the earliest violin makers and an expert double bass player. Around 80 of his instruments are known to have survived to the present day: violins (small and large), alto and tenor violas, viols, violones and double basses, violas designed with only a pair of corners, and ceteras.

== Career ==
Gasparo da Salò was born in 1542 in Salò on Lake Garda, Brescia, Italy, in a family with legal, artistic, musical and craft interests. His grandfather Santino, a land and flock owner who it is believed likely produced musical gut strings, moved from Polpenazze to Salò, capital of the Riviera del Garda, possibly in search of the greater opportunities then available in Salò, whose music scene was very rich and vibrant. Gasparo da Salò was the son and nephew of two accomplished musicians, Francesco and Agostino, who were violin players and composers of the highest professional level, distinguished enough to be referred to in surviving documents as the "violì” or "violini."

In addition to being an expert in musical instruments, da Salò's uncle Agostino was the first Kapellmeister of Salò and his son Bernardino, Gasparo da Salò's cousin, was a virtuoso musician (violinist and trombonist), who worked in Ferrara at the Este music court, and then in Mantua for Vincenzo I Gonzaga, during which time he was a contemporary of Monteverdi, and finally in Rome as "Musician of His Holiness the Pope in the Castle of S. Angel."

Gasparo da Salò's musical education took place during a period of growing refinement and professionalism among the musicians and violin players of Salò and Brescia, many of whom played in the Basilica of St. Mark in Venice, as well as many other musically distinguished European courts from the early 1540s onward. His deep education in musical performance, undertaken by his noted musical family, is evidenced in a document found in Bergamo concerning music in San Maria Maggiore dated 1603, in which Gasparo is cited as a very talented violone player.

When his father died, around 1562, da Salò moved to Brescia. It appears da Salò immediately rented a house and set up shop in the neighbourhood hub of musical life, the Contrada Antegnati, known for the presence of a very famous dynasty of organ builders, and other skilled multi-instrumentalists, who were granted a professional patent by the Brescia City Council in 1528, the first known example of such in Europe. These instrument makers were located in the Second Quadra St. John, in front of the Palazzo Vecchio del Podestà (now Via Cairoli). From his ability almost immediately to rent a house with a shop in this sought-after neighbourhood, and considering the unlikelihood of a substantial inheritance, as well as the conspicuously large family of brothers and sisters whom he helped to support financially, we can surmise that da Salò was enjoying some measure of success in the family's traditional string making trade. His business was successful enough to allow him to marry Isabetta Cassetti, the daughter of an artisan potter and glassmaker three years later. During this time Gasparo da Salò cultivated a deep relationship with Girolamo Virchi, one of the most prominent artist-craftsmen of the city, cited in a 1563 document as "maestro de musica instrumentis." In 1565 Virchi became godfather to da Salò's child Francesco, the first of seven children, including three sons named Marcantonio, two of whom died in infancy, and three daughters.

In addition, in that neighbourhood there lived two organists of Brescia Cathedral, Fiorenzo Mascara and his successor Costanzo Antegnati, and a noted violin player, Giuseppe Biagini. Like many other Brescian virtuosi multi-instrumentalists (who typically played multiple aerophones, various string instruments, and beginning from the middle of the century the new viola da braccio or violin), Mascara was an excellent viola da gamba player. This direct knowledge of, and friendship with, Virchi and Antegnati's work opened up new artistic horizons resulting in notable improvements to the sound and design of strings and stringed instruments. An Appraisal of the Policy of 1568 (a tax return) testifies to a flourishing business, which continued to grow significantly. In 1575 he bought a house in the Cossere district, his historic headquarters, and subsequently manufactured many instruments. His workshop quickly became one of the most important in Europe in the second half of the 16th century for the production of every type of stringed instrument of the time.

Gasparo da Salò developed the art of violin and string making to a very high level and passed on this tradition to five known students: his eldest son Francisco, Alexandro de Marsiliis from Marseille, France, Giovanni Paolo Maggini from Botticino in the surroundings of Brescia, Jacomo de Lafranchini from Valle Camonica, and a maker known only as Battista. Exports reached Rome, Venice and France. Gasparo da Salò's instruments were probably exported to France by Abramo Tieffenbrucker, as is indicated by the Policy of 1588, wherein some exports to France are documented (probably in particular of the model called by Monteverdi "violin piccoli alla francese" or "little violins in the French style"), as well as other surviving documents. It is also known that da Salò bought strings and precious wood for his art from Rome and Venice around this time. Income from the business enabled him to acquire extensive landholdings in the territory of Calvagese, with adjoining manor houses and farmhouses. Gasparo da Salò is known to have provided substantial assistance to his sister Ludovica, and acted as guardian to the three sons of his wife's brother, Rocco Cassetti, presumed dead, along with his own wife, in the plague of 1577.

He died on 14 April 1609. A short death notice of the time reads: "Messer Gasparo Bertolotti maestro di violini is dead & buried in Santo Joseffo." The exact location is not known where his remains lie among the graves of the Brescian musical pantheon, in company with Antegnati Costanzo, Don Cesare Bolognini and Benedetto Marcello. It is considered likely that they lie in the common grave of the carpenter's guild.

== Artistic life ==
It is debatable whether Gasparo da Salò or others like Gasparo Duiffopruggar or Andrea Amati were the first to produce the violin in its modern form; certainly, Gasparo developed an instrument of modern character, with a very quick response and a powerful tone. It is believed that the mystery of the large increase in power and projection of violas da braccio and violins of the time, sought and developed by luthiers like da Salò, is explained by the necessity of being heard while playing in mixed ensembles alongside cornettos and trombones in open air places like St. Mark Square in Venice during processions. It appears Gasparo da Salò's patterns were later studied by Stradivari between 1690 and 1700 for the violin type referred to as the "Long Strad," one of the master's most distinguished and desirable models. There is reason to believe that Brescian instruments were in fact the most popular and sought after throughout Europe in the Renaissance period, as they were more requested in high musical courts than Cremonese ones until 1630 when the plague killed the best-known Brescian masters, after which time Cremona started to become the centre of the violin maker's trade.

Although the Brescian masters did not survive the plague, their prolific and accomplished output of instruments certainly did, as a letter from Fulgencio Micanzio to Galileo Galilei dated 1636 makes clear: "the instruments from Brescia are easy to buy..." and another document states "because you can find [them] on every corner...". Many Brescian stringed instruments are listed in inventories of musical instrument makers or instrument dealers in Europe, such as the list published by Francoise Lesure in 1954, wherein the following catalogue of instruments is recorded: 63 lutes from Padua, 17 from Venice, 24 violins from Brescia, 15 lots of strings of Florence, 21 of Siena. It is also notable that the word "violino" appears in Brescian archival documents at least as early as 1530 and not in Cremona until some fifty years later. Quite a few of the Brescian violins were wonderfully decorated and many were superbly finished, while others retain some rough features of finishing, yet almost all of the authenticated surviving examples by da Salò, his workshop, or of his school or pupils, are noted for their beauty of tone and powerful projection.

Gasparo da Salò himself built many violins that conform to the measurements of the modern violin, in an era when the precise measurements of the violin family of instruments were not yet standardized, as well as a small number of models built on a smaller pattern (probably "alla francese"). In addition to violins, he built violas of different sizes from small (39 cm = 15.4") to very large (44.5 cm = 17.5"), both alto and tenor, sometimes with only two corners, as well as cellos, violones, and probably lyres and lironi.

In surviving documents, Gasparo da Salò is referred to as “maestro di violini" (violin master) as early as 1568. This title was given to violin makers and was clearly distinct in contemporary documents from the title of "sonadore de violini" (violin player). The title of maestro di violini appears to have been in use from at least 1558 in Brescia and is first attributed to the master luthiers Guglielmo Frigiadi and Francesco Inverardi years prior to the arrival of Gasparo da Salò who at that time still lived in Salò. We know comparatively little of da Salò's chief rival for the distinction of having created the first modern violin, Andrea Amati, lacking as we do the wealth of documentary evidence referencing Amati's violin-making that we have for Gasparo da Salò. Eleven documents are known to exist referencing Amati, compared with slightly less than a hundred for da Salò. Of the eleven, only one document clearly mentions the work of Amati, and it is comparatively late, dating from 1576, eight years after the document referenced above, and it states simply: "l'arte sua è de far strumenti da sonar” ("his art is of making instruments to play"). Conspicuously absent is any mention of the acclaimed Amati violin, which seems to have been manufactured from the early 1560s, apparently with great success.

From 1581 until 1588, the various written references to Gasparo da Salò as a master violin maker are further augmented with various Latin titles such as "artefici (or artifex) instrumentorum musicorum” (maker of musical instruments) and the Italian title “artefice d'istrumenti musici” (maker of musical instruments) and “instrumenti de musicha” (Instruments of music) in order to emphasize his mastery of the construction of all kinds of instruments. In 1585, he resumed the use of the old traditional title of "master of violins", which would continue to be his specialty from 1591 until his death, with the exception of a brief period in February and March 1597 wherein he is referred to as "magister a citharis", the citharis being a special and sought after instrument also known as the cetra or cetera. An archival document from 1588, a surviving tax record, clearly indicates the export of Gasparo da Salò's work to France.

About eighty of Gasparo da Salò's instruments are known to have survived to the present day. Gasparo da Salò's patterns are frequently emulated in exacting modern commercial reproductions. Charles Beare's analysis of the best works of Guarneri del Gesu's latest period, including the Vieuxtemps Guarneri of 1741, seems to demonstrate that Guarneri very strictly copied the arching used by Gasparo.

Virtuosi have also long recognized the exceptional qualities of da Salò's violins, violas, and double basses. In 1842, the Norwegian virtuoso Ole Bull was willed an unplayed, richly decorated da Salò violin originally made in 1562. Benvenuto Cellini carved the scroll of this spectacular instrument, which is on permanent display as a part of the exhibition "People and Possessions" at Vestlandske Kunstindustrimuesum in Bergen.

One of his finest instruments, a double bass with a rapidity of response similar to that of a violin (owned by the 18th - 19th-century virtuoso Domenico Dragonetti), is preserved today in the Basilica of San Marco in Venice. A second, exceptionally rare bass, possibly the only surviving example of a classical violone contrabasso with a six-hole peg box, was discovered by the Roman master luthier and restorer Luigi Ottaviani in the stores of the Museum of Musical Instruments in Rome, where it is now displayed. A third double bass is preserved in storage beneath the Royal Ontario Museum in Toronto, Canada as part of a collection donated by R. S. Williams. And a fourth was acquired by the Salodian family Biondo from M° Leonardo Colonna, for one of the double bass players of Teatro alla Scala of Milan, and is now on display in a room of the City Council Palace in Salò. This bass is used in many of the concerts of the annual Gasparo da Salò Summer Festival concert series. In addition, one of Gasparo da Salò's violins is prominently displayed at the Lobkowicz Palace in Prague.

Because of their scarcity, only five instruments made by Gasparo da Salò are known to have been auctioned since 1893. Most recently, Christie's auctioned a violin in 1980 and a viola in 2010 for $542,500.

Violists who play da Salò's instruments include Gérard Caussé, Jennifer Stumm, James Dunham, Amihai Grosz, and Cynthia Phelps.

== Sources ==
- Anton Maria Mucchi, Gasparo da Salò. Hoepli, Milano, 1940
- Farga, Franz, Violins & Violinists. Trans. Egon Larson with Bruno Raikin. New York: Frederick A. Prager, 1969.
- Andrews, Robert, Gasparo Bertolotti da Salo. Berkley 1953.
- Dassenno, Flavio - Ravasio, Ugo Gasparo da Salò e la liuteria bresciana tra rinascimento e barocco . Brescia 1990.
- Dassenno, Flavio Per gli occhi e 'l core. Strumenti musicali nell'arte. Cortefranca, 2004.
- Dassenno, Flavio (a cura di) "Gasparo architetto del suono", Città di Salò, 2009.
- Elgar, Raymond (1967). Looking at the Double Bass. Baskerville Press.
