= Antonio Amati =

Italian luthier (c.1537 - 1607)

Antonio Amati (c. 1537 – 4 March 1607) was an Italian luthier, active from 1560 to 1605.

== Biography ==
Born in Cremona, Andrea Amati's son and Girolamo Amati's brother, Antonio worked first with his father, then with his brother, in the same workshop. With the latter, he refined his construction technique and style. For about ten years, they co-signed their works with their Latinized names: "Antonius & Hieronymus Amati"

== Instruments ==
The instruments with the common label of Antonio and Girolamo can hardly be assigned to the individual brothers, even for experts. They worked extraordinarily cleanly and experimented on the construction of the violin, especially on the contours, vaults and f-holes. Characteristic is a recessed gorge, which is responsible for the warm tone of their exhibits.

The Cremonese violin-making school

Andrea Amati c. 1505–1577
Antonio Amati c. 1537–1607	Girolamo Amati; 1561–1630
Nicola Amati; 1596–1684
Jacob Stainer c. 1618–1683	Antonio Stradivari; 1644–1737	Girolamo Amati II; 1649–1740	Andrea Guarneri; 1626–1698
F. Stradivari; 1671–1743	O. Stradivari; 1679–1742	Pietro Guarneri; 1655–1720	Giuseppe Guarneri; 1666–c. 1739/40
Giuseppe Guarneri "del Gesu"; 1698–1744	Pietro Guarneri "de Venice"; 1695–1762

- solid lines = Pere-Fils (father to son)
- dashed lines = Maitre-Eleve (master to student)

== See also ==
- Giuseppe Guarneri
- Antonio Stradivari
- Amati Violas

== Bibliography ==
- William Henley's Universal Dictionary of Violin & Bow Makers, Brighton, Amati, 1973.
- Cacciatori, Fausto: Il DNA degli Amati, Cremona 2006, ISBN 978-8889839119.
- Die Musik in Geschichte und Gegenwart (MGG2), Personenteil Vol. 1, Bärenreiter, Kassel 1999.
- Stefan Drees: Lexikon der Violine, Laaber-Verlag, Laaber 2004, ISBN 978-3-89007-544-0.
- Walter Kolneder: Das Buch der Violine. Bau, Geschichte, Spiel, Pädagogik, Komposition. Atlantis Musikbuchverlag, Zürich 1993, ISBN 3-254-00147-8.
- Philip J. Kass: The Stati D’Anime of S. Faustino in Cremona: Tracing the Amati Family 1641-1686, Violin Society of America, 1999.
- Philip J. Kass: Nicolo Amatl: His Life and Times, Journal of the Violin Society of America, 15-2. 1996.
