= Girolamo Amati =

Italian luthier (1561 - 1630)

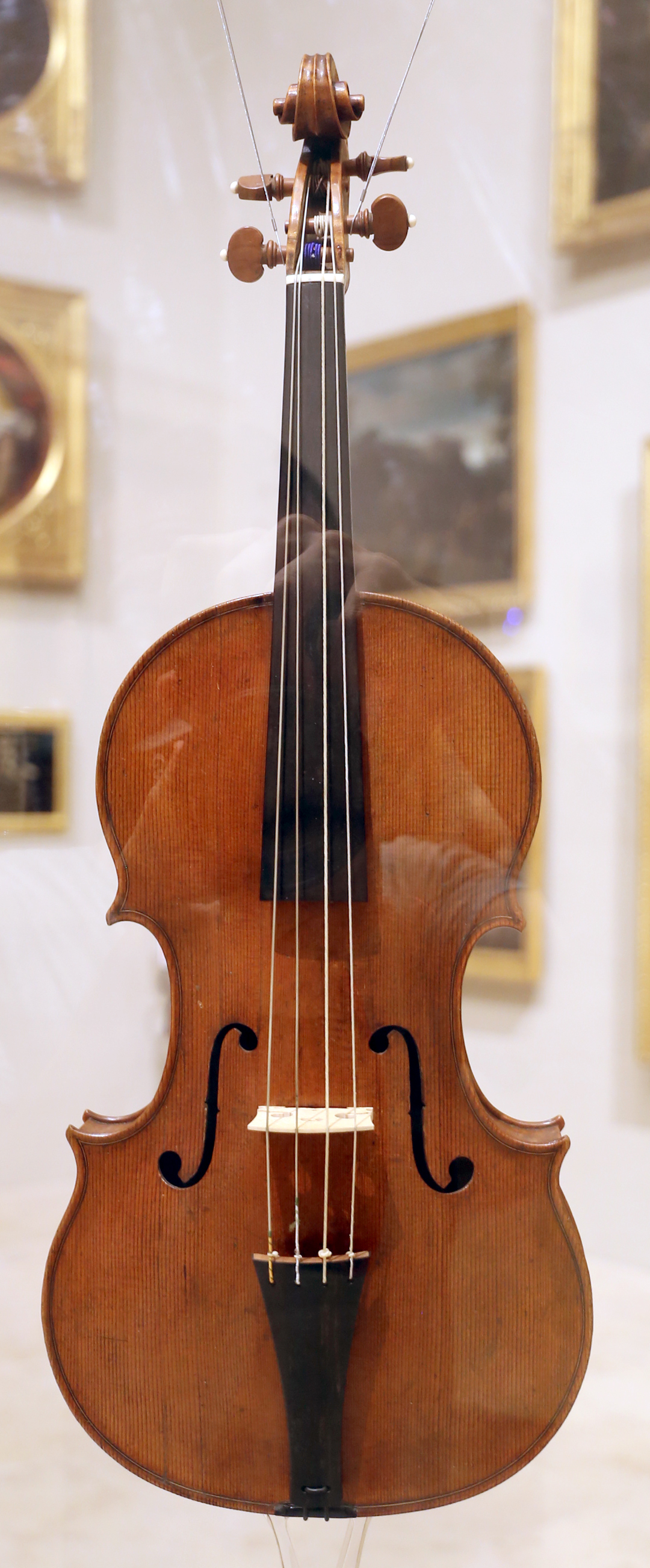
Viola, 1625, Galleria Estense, Modena

Girolamo Amati (1561–1630) was an Italian luthier, active from 1580 to 1630.

== Biography ==
Born in Cremona, Girolamo was the youngest son of Andrea Amati and brother of Antonio Amati. Girolamo worked, probably from 1575, with his brother, in his father's workshop. With the latter, he refined his construction technique and style. For about ten years, they co-signed their works with their Latinized names: "Antonius & Hieronymus Amati".

Girolamo slightly increased the size of his instruments, compared to those of his father.

His son, Nicolò Amati (1596-1684), whom he trained in the workshop, was the master of Andrea Guarneri and possibly of Antonio Stradivari and Francesco Rugeri.

== See also ==
- Amati Violas

== Sources ==
- Price History Girolamo II Amati
- Price History Antoni & Girolamo Amati
- William Henley's Universal Dictionary of Violin & Bow Makers, Brighton, Amati, 1973
