= James Perry (luthier) =

Irish luthier (c.1759–1810)

- Séamus de Poire
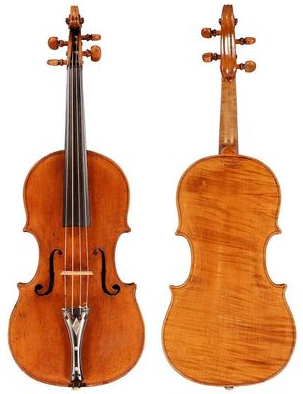
- Violin by Perry, c. 1800
- Born: c. 1759; Dublin, Ireland
- Died: c. 1810; Kilkenny, Ireland
- Education: Thomas Perry
- Known for: Luthier
- Style: Perry style; Stainer style
- Movement: Irish school
- Parent: John Perry (father)
- Relatives: Thomas Perry (brother); John Perry (brother); Joseph Perry (cousin); William Wilkinson (nephew)
- Patrons: Ormonde family

James Perry (Irish: Séamus de Poire; c. 1759–1810) was an Irish luthier from Dublin, known for making violins, violas and cellos. His workshop was based in Kilkenny and also produced instruments such as guitars, German flutes, fifes and tenors. Perry is credited with having made over 1000 instruments. He was a brother and apprentice to Dublin luthier, Thomas Perry, and a protégé of the Ormonde family of Kilkenny Castle.

== Early life ==
James Perry was born in Dublin around 1759 to John Perry, a musical instrument maker and landowner from Tinnakill near Raheen, County Laois. James was one of at least three sons that would go on to become successful luthiers. The eldest son, Thomas (born c. 1738), started working in Christchurch Yard in Dublin around the same year James was born and would go on to become one of Ireland's most prolific luthiers. The second eldest brother, John (born c. 1747), would also become a well-known maker, working at High Street in Belfast from around 1768. Joseph Perry, who was thought to be a cousin of James's, was another highly regarded luthier from Dublin, whose work has been compared to that of English maker Benjamin Banks. James also had a sister, Elizabeth Perry, whose son, William Wilkinson (born c. 1769), would apprentice to and later go into partnership with James's brother Thomas.

James was most likely the youngest in the Perry family, almost 20 years younger than his eldest brother, Thomas. Growing up, he would have been surrounded by instrument making, with his father and two older brothers all being established instrument makers by the time he was 10 years old. It is likely that, as a young boy, James spent a great deal of time around the workshop in Christchurch Yard, and probably developed a strong penchant for instrument making at a very young age. Furthermore, the surrounding area of Christ Church, where James would have grown up, was synonymous with violin making in 18th century Dublin, boasting great makers such as Thomas Molineux, George Ward, as well as some of the earliest-known Dublin makers such as John Neale, Thomas Dunne and Dennis Connor.

== Career ==
=== Apprenticeship and early career: 1773–1781 ===
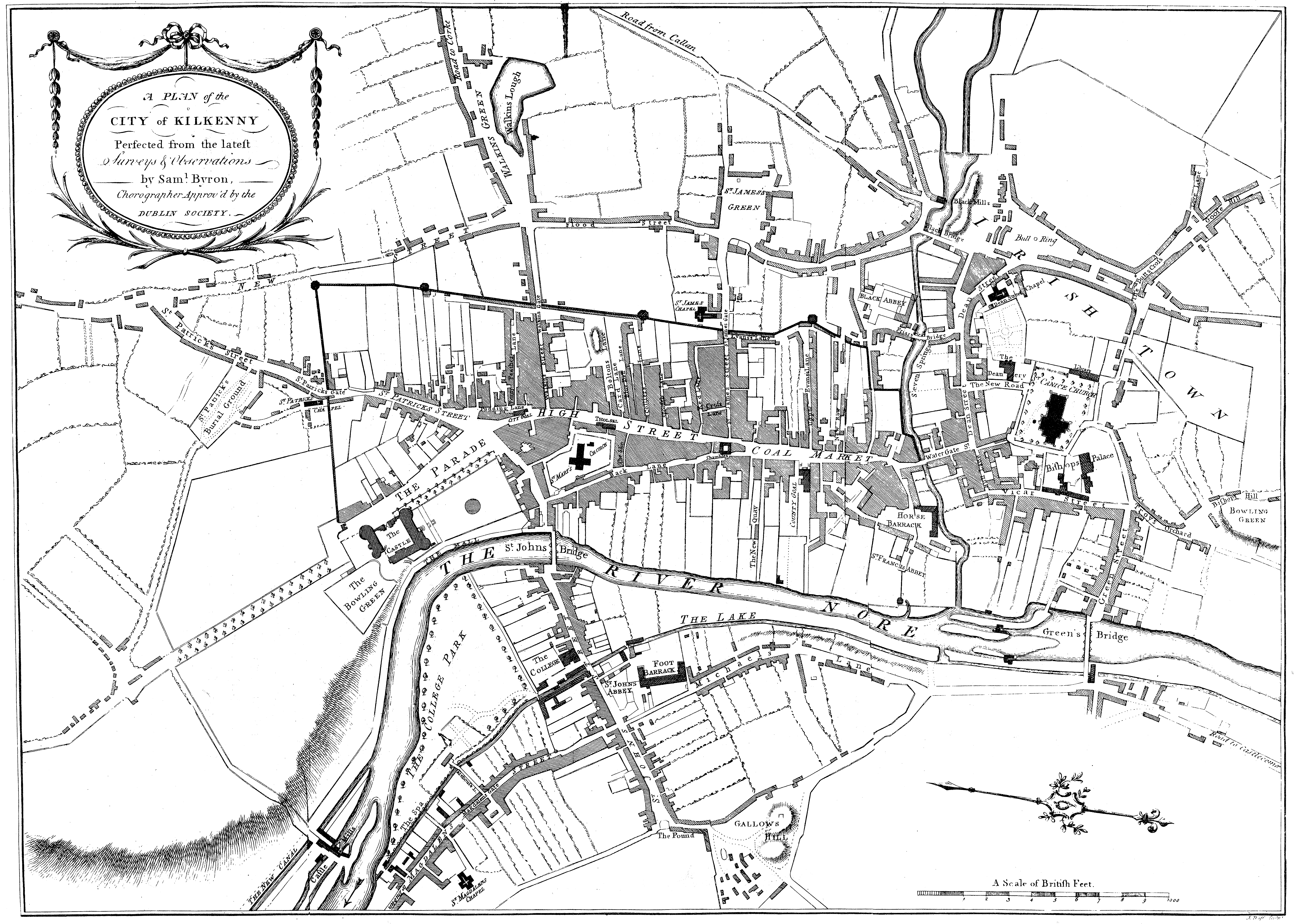
Map of Kilkenny, c. 1780, showing Back Lane and Red Lane.

James was apprenticed to his brother Thomas at Anglesea Street in Dublin between 1773 and 1780. By then, his brother Thomas had been working independently for nearly 15 years and was a very accomplished maker. There, James learned his trade as a luthier and adopted many traits typical of the Perry school. Throughout his career, James' instruments would continue to bear a stark resemblance to that of his brothers' early period.

Following his apprenticeship in Dublin, James moved to Kilkenny in 1781 and set up his own shop on a street known as Back Lane (now Saint Kieran's Street). It is possible that he decided to move to Kilkenny to avoid competing with his more established brother and teacher, Thomas, just as his other brother, John, had moved to Belfast around 1768. On August 18, 1781, James posted an advertisement in Finn's Leinster Journal to help spread the word of his new business in Kilkenny which read:

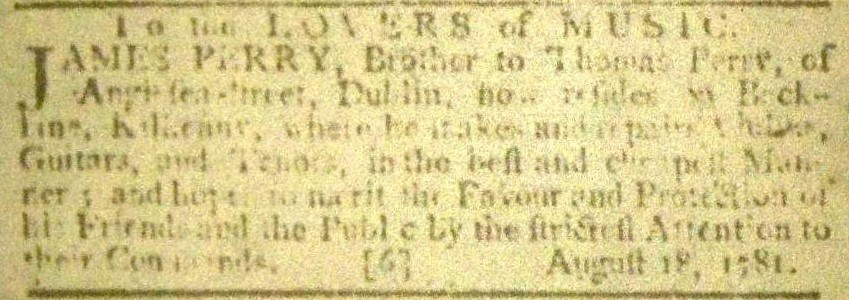
Perry's newspaper advertisement in Finn's Leinster Journal, August 18, 1781.

To the LOVERS of MUSIC.
JAMES PERRY, Brother to Thomas Perry, of Anglesea-street, Dublin, now resides in Back-lane, Kilkenny, where he makes and repairs Violins, Guitars, and Tenors, in the best and cheapest Manner; and hopes to merit the Favour and Protection of his Friends and the Public by the strictest Attention to their Commands.
August 18, 1781.

=== Patronage and later career: 1781–1810 ===
Perry's business soon came under the patronage of the Ormonde family of Kilkenny Castle, as well as other nobility and gentry within the city and county of Kilkenny. He established himself as a general musical instrument maker, producing and repairing instruments such as violins, violas, cellos, guitars, German flutes, fifes and tenors. Perry's shop also sold sheet music, including existing and newly published works. In 1788, Perry is listed in the Dublin Directories as a violin, violoncello and guitar maker at 4 Trinity Street in Dublin. It is possible that he made regular trips back to Dublin, where his family were from, and would work from an address such as this during extended visits. On July 31, 1792, Perry posted another advertisement in Finn's Leinster Journal, this time thanking his patrons and the general public, and stating his commitment to serve them in the future. The advertisement also listed the broad range of services that his shop offered at the time and read as follows:

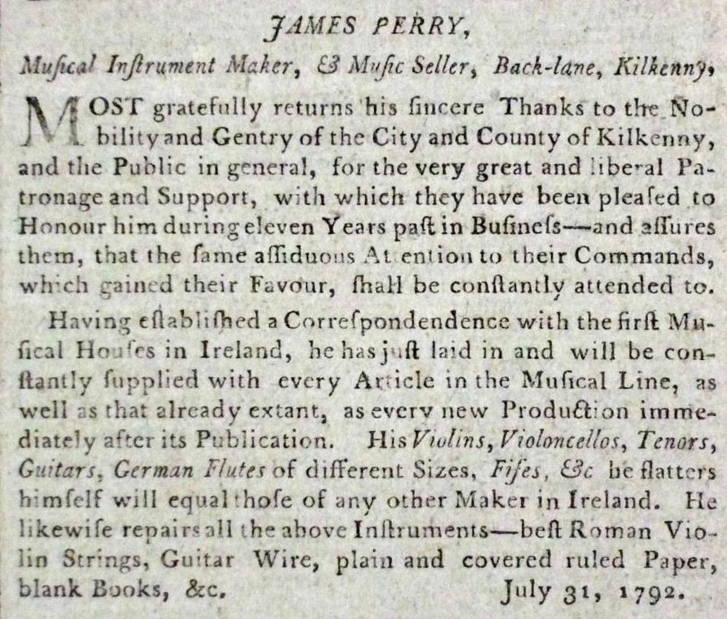
Perry's newspaper advertisement in Finn's Leinster Journal, July 31, 1792.

JAMES PERRY,
Musical Instrument Maker, & Music Seller, Back-lane, Kilkenny,
MOST gratefully returns his sincere Thanks to the Nobility and Gentry of the City and County of Kilkenny, and the Public in general, for the very great and liberal Patronage and Support, with which they have been pleased to Honour him during eleven Years passed in Business—and assures them, that the same assiduous Attention to their Commands, which gained their Favour, shall be constantly attended to.
Having established a Correspondendence with the first Musical Houses in Ireland, he has just laid in and will be constantly supplied with every Article in the Musical Line, as well as that already extant, as every new Production immediately after its Publication. His Violins, Violoncellos, Tenors, Guitars, German Flutes of different Sizes, Fifes, &c he flatters himself will equal those of any other Maker in Ireland. He likewise repairs all the above Instruments—best Roman Violin Strings, Guitar Wire, plain and covered ruled Paper, blank books, &c.
July 31, 1792.

In 1797, Italian luthier, Vincenzo Panormo, came to Ireland and worked for Bartholomew Murphy in Cork for 3 years. In 1799, Panormo moved to Dublin to work for Perry's brother, Thomas. However, a cello recorded in the National Archives of Ireland bearing the label 'Vincenzo Panormo/fecit Kilkenny/Irelande, 1799', suggests that Panormo worked in Kilkenny for a short period of time, perhaps on his journey from Cork to Dublin. It is very likely that Panormo made the Kilkenny cello in James Perry's workshop, given the connection to his brother, Thomas. By this time, James's workshop was located in a part of Kilkenny called Red Lane (no longer in existence) but he was living in a separate building on Velvet Lane, near the steps up to St Canice's Cathedral.

It is not known when Perry stopped working as a luthier or even when he died. His latest identified instrument dates from 1810 (no. 1417), suggesting that he stopped working or died around this time.

== Style and technique ==
Perry's style of violin making was very typical of the early Irish school, which was heavily influenced by the Stainer model. His violins bear a striking resemblance to those of his brother Thomas's earlier instruments and those of George Ward, who Thomas likely apprenticed with. Perry used a dark brown varnish on his earlier instruments, and a more golden brown varnish on his later ones, as did his brother. The f-holes of his instruments exhibit exaggerated styling with a small upper volute, similar to that seen on the instruments of his brother Thomas and George Ward. Perry branded his instruments externally 'JAMES PERRY/KILKENNY' or 'J PERRY/KILKENNY' at the back below the button, another signature of the Irish school.

Perry's workmanship was considered to be quite rough compared to that of his brother, Thomas', but his instruments were said to have an excellent and remarkably sweet tone. Their sweet tone would become particularly favourable with Irish traditional players, some favouring his instruments over those of his brother, Thomas'. Notes made by the Kilkenny Archaeological Society in 15 November 1953 remarked that he was a "violin maker of great repute" and that "his violins are still used and cherished by Kilkenny folk".

The Irish violin-making school

Thomas Molineux c. 1700–1757
Patrick Harford fl. 1730–1752	Martyn Molineux c. 1720–?	John Perry I c. 1710–1787	George Ward c. 1715–1769	John Ward c. 1703–1778
Thomas Perry c. 1738–1818
James Perry c. 1759–1810	John Delany c. 1769–1838	William Ringwood c. 1769–1842	Richard Tobin c. 1766–1847	William Wilkinson c. 1767–1830	John Mackintosh c. 1780–1841
Daniel Compton ?–?	Arthur Ringwood c. 1812–1860	George Tobin c. 1809–1861

- solid lines = Pere-Fils
- dashed lines = Maitre-Eleve

== Extant instruments ==
It is unknown how many instruments Perry produced in his lifetime. Some accounts say that he produced some 300 instruments, although this may refer exclusively to stringed instruments. There are surviving Perry instruments that are labelled with numbers that exceed 1000. It is likely that Perry achieved such a high output by numbering all of the instruments produced by his workshop, including smaller instruments such as flutes, fifes and tenors. Perry would have adopted such a numbering system from his brother, Thomas, who also achieved an extraordinarily high output, most likely in the same manner.

Some of Perry's extant instruments:

=== Violins ===
Year	Number	Location	LOB	Notes
1776		Dublin	35.9 cm	One of the earliest known instruments made by Perry. Made while working for his brother Thomas in Dublin during his apprenticeship. Labelled 'Made by James Perry, Dublin, 1776'. Retains its original neck and fingerboard.
1783	129	Kilkenny		In the collection of the Dadswell family, Australia. Brought from London to Australia in 1857 by Thomas William Dadswell (b. 1828), during which time he made two replicas of the instrument, one of which remains in the family. Labelled 'Made by James Perry, Back Lane, Kilkenny, No. 129, 1783'. Consists of a one-piece front and two-piece back with golden brown varnish and inlaid purfling.
1783	137	Kilkenny		Labelled 'Made by James Perry, Back Lane, Kilkenny, No. 137, 1783'.
1785	200	Kilkenny		Labelled 'Made by James Perry, Kilkenny, No. 200, 1785'.
c. 1790		Kilkenny	35.7 cm	Branded 'J PERRY/KILKENNY' at the back below the button. Consists of a one-piece front and one-piece back with golden varnish and inlaid purfling.
c. 1790		Kilkenny	35.4 cm	Branded 'PERRY/KILKENNY' at the back below the button. Consists of a two-piece front and one-piece back with golden varnish and inlaid purfling. Sold by Amati in June 2024 for £800 - £1,200 (Lot 180).
1799	1020	Kilkenny	35.6 cm	Labelled 'Made by James Perry, Kilkenny, No. 1020, 1799'. Consists of a one-piece front of medium grained pine and one-piece back of horizontal medium curled maple with golden brown varnish and inlaid purfling.
1800		Kilkenny	35.4 cm	Branded 'JAMES PERRY/KILKENNY' at the back below the button. Consists of a one-piece front and one-piece back with golden varnish and inlaid purfling. Retains original neck and pegs.
1810	1417	Kilkenny	35.6 cm	Labelled 'Made by James Perry, Kilkenny, No. 1417, 1810' and branded 'JAMES PERRY/KILKENNY' at the back below the button. Inked purfling.

=== Violas ===
Year	Number	Location	LOB	Notes
1786		Kilkenny	39.5 cm	One of the only identified violas by Perry. Sold by Sotheby's for £4,400 in June 1990 (Lot 261).

=== Viola d'amores ===
Year	Number	Location	LOB	Notes
1769		Dublin		One of the only identified viola d'amores and earliest instrument by Perry. The date may be a mistake or suggests that he was making instruments as a child prior to his official apprenticeship. Sold by Bloomsbury's for £23,472 in May 2008 (Lot 132). Consists of an arched one-piece back with flame-shaped sound holes. Retains its original fingerboard and tailpiece made of ivory.

=== Cellos ===
Year	Number	Location	LOB	Notes
c. 1790		Kilkenny		One of the only identified cellos by Perry. Branded 'PERRY/KILKENNY' at the back below the button. The absence of 'James' or 'J' in the branding suggests that it may have been made by his brother, Thomas, on an extended visit to Kilkenny. Consists of a two-piece front and two-piece back with golden brown varnish and inlaid purfling.

== See also ==
- Thomas Perry (luthier)
- Vincenzo Panormo
- Richard Tobin
