= John Mackintosh (luthier) =

Scottish luthier

- Iain Mac an Tòisich
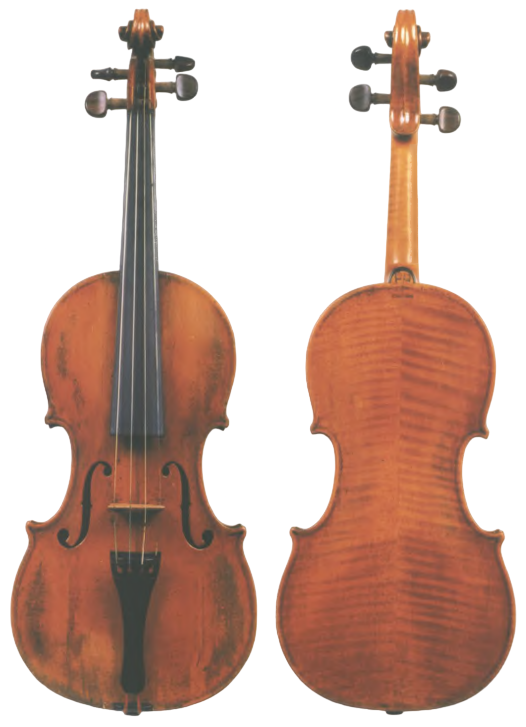
- Violin by Mackintosh, c. 1817
- Born: c. 1780; Tinereoch, Vale of Athole, Scotland
- Died: 18 December 1850 (aged 69–70); Dovecotland, Scotland
- Education: Thomas Perry
- Known for: Luthier, author
- Notable work: violin, NMI & Chimei collections
- Style: Amati style; Guarneri style; Stradivari style
- Movement: Irish school
- Children: Robert J. Mackintosh (son)
- Parent: James Mackintosh (father)
- Relatives: Robert Mackintosh (uncle); James Mackintosh (nephew)

John Mackintosh (Scottish Gaelic: Iain Mac an Tòisich; c. 1780–1850) was a Scottish luthier, author and maker of violins who flourished in Dublin, Ireland in the first half of the 19th century. Towards the end of his career, he wrote a short publication on violin making and the Cremonese school, in which he claimed to have rediscovered their forgotten technique of wood preservation. Two of his violins are housed in museum collections, one at the National Museum of Ireland, Dublin and the other at the Chimei Museum, Tainan, Taiwan.

== Early life ==
Mackintosh was born in a place called Tinereoch, situated in the Vale of Athole in the heart of the Scottish Highlands around 1780. His father, James Mackintosh, was born in nearby Tullymet, near Pitlochry, Perthshire, and worked as a blacksmith in Tinereoch. His uncle, Robert Mackintosh, known as 'Red Rob' on account of the colour of his hair, was a well-known Scottish composer and violinist, active in Edinburgh at the end of the 18th century.

Mackintosh had four brothers, all of whom, including him, were violin players. It is possible that they learned to play from their uncle, Robert, who was also a violin teacher. However, since Robert had already moved to Edinburgh in the early 1770's, they may have learned from their father, James, as it is likely that he also played. One of Mackintosh's brothers, David, was pipe major to the 93rd Highlanders and died in Portugal. His other three brothers did not pursue a profession in music. One of them, Donald Mackintosh, was a lint-miller at Blairgowrie and his son, James Mackintosh (1801–1873), went on to become a luthier there and produce 204 violins, 10 violas, and 35 cellos.

Before Mackintosh became a luthier, he was bandmaster to the 42nd Highlanders, also known as the Black Watch. It is stated in his obituary that he acquired the art of violin-making there, before moving to Ireland. It is unknown with whom Mackintosh would have received such training, or whether he even underwent a formal apprenticeship in Scotland, though it is widely accepted that he later apprenticed in Dublin with Thomas Perry. If Mackintosh did receive formal training before moving to Ireland, one possible teacher, based on his location, is Peter Hardie (1775–1863) of Dunkeld, Perthshire, known as "Highland Hardie", but this has never been documented. However, it has been suggested that Mackintosh's nephew, James, was probably a pupil of Hardies.

Several other makers by the same surname as Mackintosh flourished in Scotland in the 19th and 20th centuries, but no family connection has ever been suggested as they were from different parts of Scotland and also used alternative spellings, such as "MacIntosh" and "M'Intosh".

== Career ==
=== Apprenticeship and early career in Dublin: 1808–1819 ===
Mackintosh left Scotland some time in the early 19th century and settled in Dublin, Ireland. He was apprenticed to Dublin maker Thomas Perry at 6 Anglesea Street between 1808 and 1817. Perry's workshop was well established by this time and had seen many notable makers pass through its doors, including James Perry, William Ringwood, Richard Tobin, John Delany and Vincenzo Panormo. By the time Mackintosh joined the firm, it was known as Perry & Wilkinson, as Perry had gone into partnership with his nephew and former apprentice, William Wilkinson in 1789. Ringwood had been working for Perry since 1783 and was an associate of the firm by this time. Mackintosh is believed to have been Perry's last apprentice (he died the year after Mackintosh finished, in November 1818). However, because Perry would have been in his seventies during his apprenticeship, it has been suggested that Mackintosh may have received much of his instruction from Ringwood.

Following his apprenticeship to Perry, Mackintosh set up his own workshop at 1 Essex Quay, Dublin, in 1817. Mackintosh's choice of address was likely deliberate; there was an abundance of skilled craftsmen and musical-instrument makers working on Essex quay during the first half of the 19th century. Probably the most notable craftsman to work on Essex Quay was Dublin medallist William Mossop (1751–1804), who resided at 13 Essex Quay from 1784, where his son, also William (1788–1827), succeeded him. In fact, it is believed that Mackintosh shared this premises with a pipemaker named Timothy Kenna, who had earlier succeeded his father Thomas's business at this address. Mackintosh worked at 1 Essex Quay up until 1819.

=== Experimentation and later career in Dublin: 1819–1841 ===
In 1819, Mackintosh moved to 10 Essex Quay, where he worked until 1824. Around the same time, John Dollard, another violin maker, was working at 15 Essex Quay. In 1825, Mackintosh moved to 11 Aston Quay, where he remained until 1834. This building consisted of three stories with a yard and stable offices. Aston Quay was another area where notable violin makers had resided, such as 18th century maker George Ward. From 1834 onwards, Mackintosh resided at 12 Lower Ormond Quay with his eldest son, Robert J. Mackintosh, a professor of music, and an accomplished violinist and leader of the Philharmonic Society of Dublin. Brian Boydell notes that John Mackintosh too was a professor of some description. While he is listed in the 1836 Post Office Directory as a "professor and musical instrument maker", this may have been mistaken for his son's profession. In an 1841 publication titled The Native Music of Ireland, John Mackintosh is described as "a musical instrument maker of considerable celebrity in this city", which suggests that he was well known throughout Dublin City for his ability as a violin maker. At the height of his business, Mackintosh was earning more than £300 a year, and selling his instruments for as much as £30 each, which equates to about £5,000 in today's money.

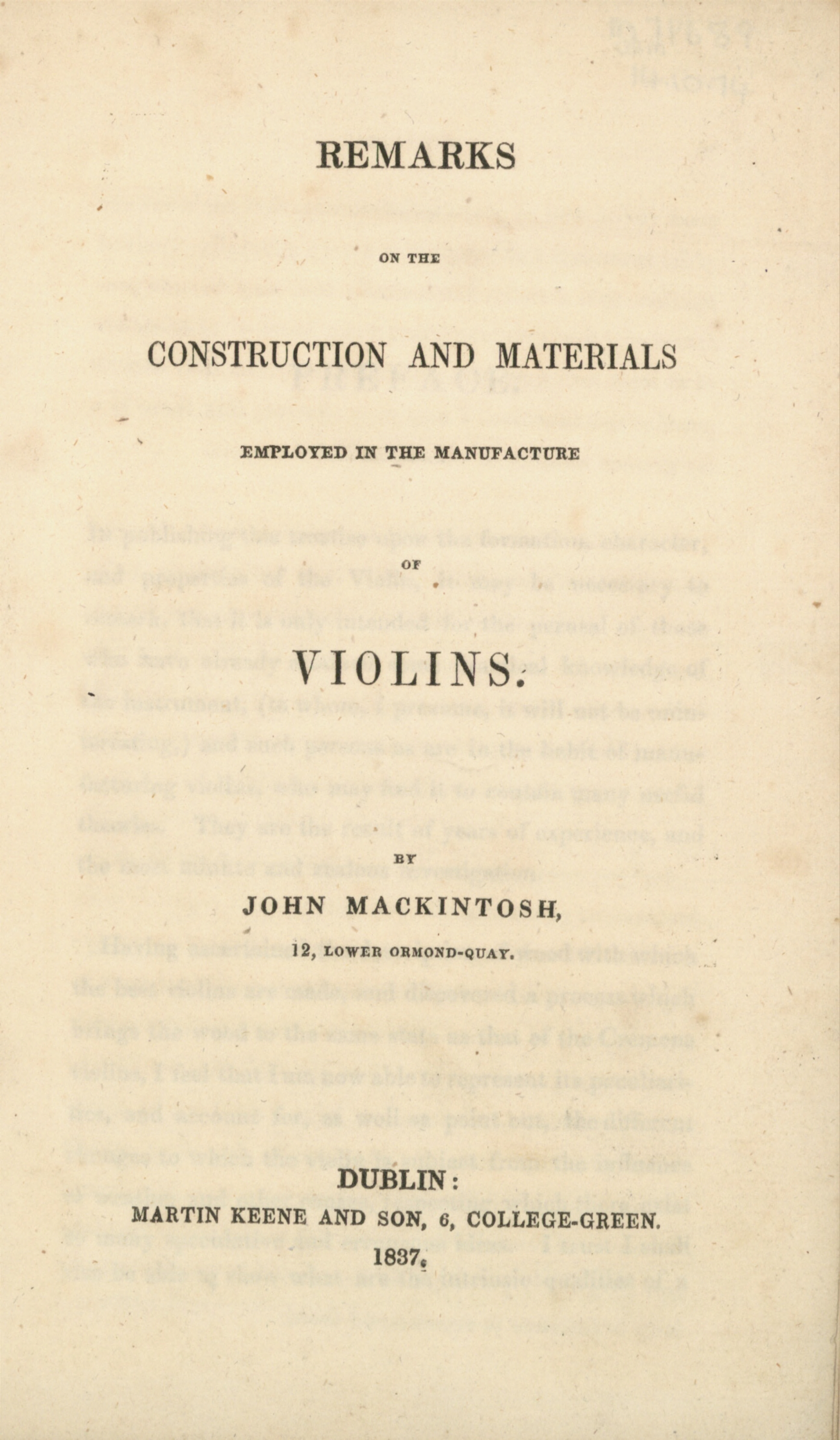
Cover of Mackintosh's 1837 publication on violin making

In 1837, Mackintosh published a short book on violin making titled Remarks on the Construction and Materials Employed in the Manufacture of Violins. In the book, he deals with the topics of wood, tone, bridge and sound post, and the Cremonese school. In particular, he stresses the importance of choosing good quality, mature timber with pores of a certain size and formation that have been dried and cleansed through a natural process. Furthermore, he states that age is not necessary to produce a good instrument and that violins as good as those of the Cremonese school can be achieved by contemporary makers with the correct approach. Mackintosh continued to live and work at 12 Lower Ormond Quay until at least 1841, according to the Post Office Directory. Boydell and William Henley incorrectly suggested that he died in Dublin in 1840, perhaps because his name disappeared from the Dublin Directories shortly after this date. His son Robert continued to live at 12 Lower Ormond Quay up until at least 1842.

=== Return to Scotland and later life: 1841–1850 ===
Sometime around 1841, Mackintosh returned to his native Scotland and settled in Dovecotland, Perthshire. His obituary suggests that he had abandoned violin-making, much to the opposition of his fiends, and had become obsessed with the epistemically impossible task of trying to invent perpetual movement. It is said that he pursued this impossible task with doggedness for the next 10 or so years. Mackintosh spent the final few years of his life as a recluse in his attic, refusing assistance from friends or family. He died tragically of starvation and poverty in December 1850. His obituary was published in The Times on Friday, 20 December and described him as a "violin-maker sometime residing in Dovecotland, and lately Dublin. M'Intosh was a Highlandman, and there acquired the art of violin-making, afterwards went to Ireland, where he commenced business...".

== Style and technique ==
Mackintosh's style was typical of the later Irish school and heavily influenced by the Cremonese style of violin making. During his apprenticeship, he learned to make violins based on the Amati model, which his teacher, Perry, had by then adopted in favour of the earlier Stainer model. Perry is said to have studied directly from an Amati instrument lent to him by the Duke of Leinster. Additionally, Mackintosh would typically brand his violins externally at the back below the button 'MACKINTOSH/DUBLIN', a signature of the Irish school.

Mackintosh based his violins broadly on Italian models, including Amati, Stradivari and Guarneri. In his 1837 publication, Mackintosh states that he had studied each of these makers in great detail, particularly Stradivari, of whom he had several instruments pass through his hands. Mackintosh also experimented greatly in pursuit of replicating the old Italian masters' instruments. He states that he tried "steaming, steeping, stoving, boiling, and baking the timber", as well as using "all kinds of spirits, caustics, and acids" but that "these disorganised the pores and impaired the fibres of the timber". He also states that he discovered the process by which such instruments could be achieved, and that 16 years earlier he had produced "three violins of timber which had been in a certain situation for a particular purpose" which were since reported by their owners to be as good as any Cremona instrument. This would suggest that he made such instruments around 1821 whilst working at 10 Essex Quay.

The Irish violin-making school

Thomas Molineux c. 1700–1757
Patrick Harford fl. 1730–1752	Martyn Molineux c. 1720–?	John Perry I c. 1710–1787	George Ward c. 1715–1769	John Ward c. 1703–1778
Thomas Perry c. 1738–1818
James Perry c. 1759–1810	John Delany c. 1769–1838	William Ringwood c. 1769–1842	Richard Tobin c. 1766–1847	William Wilkinson c. 1767–1830	John Mackintosh c. 1780–1841
Daniel Compton ?–?	Arthur Ringwood c. 1812–1860	George Tobin c. 1809–1861

- solid lines = Pere-Fils
- dashed lines = Maitre-Eleve

== Extant instruments ==
It is unknown how many instruments Mackintosh produced in his lifetime as they were not numbered. One of his violins is preserved in the National Museum of Ireland as part of a collection of musical instruments by Irish makers. The collection also includes instruments by other 18th and 19th century luthiers including Mackintosh's teacher, Perry, as well as John Delany, Thomas Molyneux and George Ward. Another of his violins is preserved as part of the Chimei Museum's musical instruments collection.

Some of Mackintosh's extant instruments:

=== Violins ===
Year	Location	LOB	Notes
	Dublin		In the National Museum of Ireland collection.
	Dublin		In the Royal Irish Academy of Music collection.
	Dublin		Branded 'McIntosh of Dublin'.
1815	Dublin		One of the earliest known instruments made by Mackintosh. Made while working for Perry in Dublin during his apprenticeship or shortly thereafter. Sold in September 1992 for £528.
c. 1817	Dublin	35.6 cm	Labelled 'Made by John Mackintosh, No. 1 Essex Quay, Dublin' and branded 'MACKINTOSH' at the back below the button. Consists of a two-piece front of medium grained pine and a two-piece back of medium curled maple descending from the joint with golden amber varnish and inked purfling. The plates are rather thick with quite low arching. Based on the Amati model.
c. 1820	Dublin	35.1 cm	Branded 'MACKINTOSH' at the back below the button. Consists of a two-piece front and a two-piece back of medium curled maple descending from the joint with golden amber varnish and inked purfling. Based on the Amati model.
c. 1830	Dublin		Branded 'MACKINTOSH/DUBLIN' at the back below the button. Consists of a two-piece front and a two-piece back with golden brown varnish and inked purfling.
c. 1830	Dublin		Advertised for sale in Musical Canada by R. S. Williams & Sons, Toronto in 1913 for $100. Consists of a two-piece front and a two-piece back of flamed maple with sides and scroll to match and dark brown varnish.

== Publications ==
- Mackintosh J. (1837) Remarks on the Construction and Materials Employed in the Manufacture of Violins. Dublin: Martin Keene & Son.

== See also ==
- Thomas Perry (luthier)
- William Ringwood
