= John Delany (luthier) =

Irish luthier (1769–1838)

- Seán Ó Dubhshláine
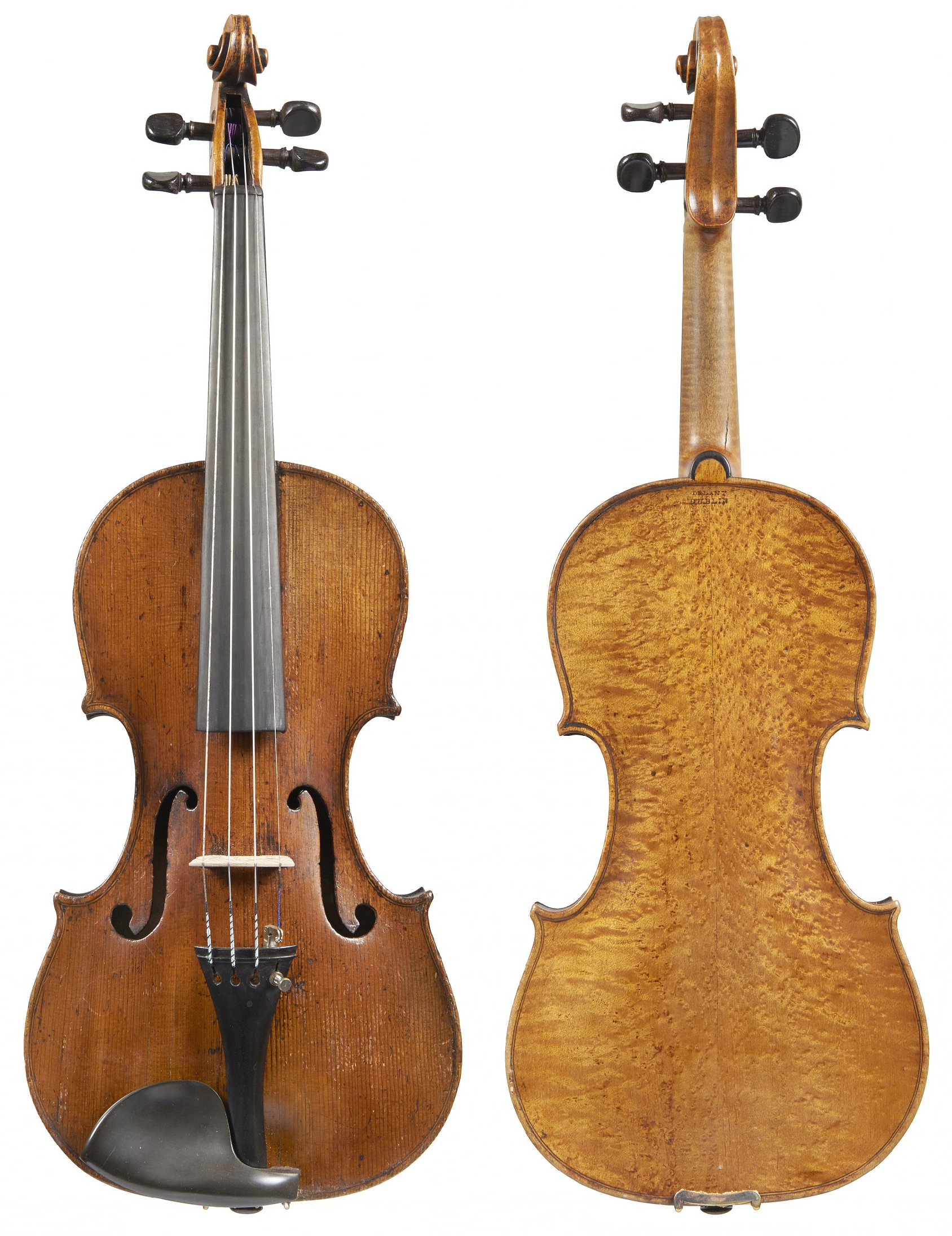
- Violin by Delany, c. 1800
- Born: John William Delany; 1769; The Liberties, Dublin, Ireland
- Died: 1838 (aged 68–69); Dublin, Ireland
- Education: Thomas Perry
- Known for: Luthier; labels
- Notable work: 2 violins, NMI collection
- Style: Amati style; Perry style; Stainer style
- Movement: Irish school
- Parents: Daniel Delany (father); Mary Byrne (mother)
- Relatives: Cathal Gannon (great-great-grandnephew); Cornelius Gannon (nephew)

John William Delany (Irish: Seán Ó Dubhshláine; 1769 – 1838) was an Irish luthier and maker of violins and violas from Dublin. His instruments have become known for their unusual labels, often expressing his support for liberty and racial equality. Two of Delany's violins are preserved as part of a collection in the National Museum of Ireland, Dublin.

== Early life ==
Delany was born in Dublin in 1769 to Daniel Delany, a cabinetmaker, and Mary Byrne. On 20 November 1771, Delany was baptised John William Delany in the parish of St Catherine's, a Roman Catholic parish in Meath Street, Dublin. Delany's parents were married in the same church the year before on 29 October 1770. It is therefore possible that Delany was born thereafter, sometime in the Summer or Autumn of 1771. It is likely that Delany grew up in this part of inner city Dublin, known as The Liberties, as his father's business was later located on nearby Crane Street.

It has been suggested that Delany's family may have originally been landowners in Queen's County (now County Laois), like many of the other Irish luthier families, such as the Molineuxs, Wards, Perrys and Wilkinsons. There is evidence of Delanys residing in Tinnakill, a rural area near Raheen in County Laois, where the Perry family owned substantial quantities of land. This could explain the connection to Thomas Perry of Dublin, to whom Delany later apprenticed to.

Before starting his career as a luthier, Delany was trained in the family business as a cabinetmaker. He would have begun a formal apprenticeship around the age of 14, sometime about 1783. He may have been apprenticed to his father, who was a cabinetmaker, or to some other master craftsman, as was common practice at the time. His apprenticeship with the Carpenters' Guild of the City of Dublin would have taken at least 7 years to complete. By around 1790, Delany would have been a fully-trained cabinet maker and was described as a "true artist in wood work". Around this time, his father's cabinetry business was located on 1 Crane Street off Thomas Street in Dublin. In 1795, Delany's father died and a probate was conducted to deal with his estate.

== Career ==
=== Apprenticeship and early career: 1796–1810 ===
Delany's career as a luthier started relatively late in life. He was apprenticed to Dublin luthier Thomas Perry between 1796 and 1803, making him about 27 when he started. While this would have been considered old for an apprentice at the time, Delany was already a competent cabinet maker, which likely accelerated his training as a luthier. By this time, Perry had gone into partnership with his son-in-law, William Wilkinson, and another luthier, William Ringwood, was working as an associate of the firm. It is likely that another one of Perry's old apprentices, Richard Tobin, was still working for the Perry firm at this time, as his hand can be seen in some Perry instruments from this period. In 1799, Italian luthier, Vincenzo Panormo, came to Dublin and spent a few years working for Perry during the latter part of Delany's apprenticeship.

During those years, Perry's workshop was located at 6 Anglesea Street in Dublin, but Delany does not appear to have worked from this address for much of his apprenticeship. One of Delany's earliest identified violins, dated 1799, is labelled as having been made at 11 Townsend Street, Dublin. A publican named Thomas Perry is listed at 15 Townsend Street in the 1801 Dublin Directories and a Thomas Perry of Townsend Street is listed in the 1799 Public Records, thus it is possible that the Perry family owned property in the area and used it as additional workshop space given the large number of luthiers working for the Perry firm at the time. It is also likely that as an established cabinet maker, Delany maintained his own premises throughout his apprenticeship as a luthier and worked from there primarily, only requiring part-time guidance from his mentor.

In 1800, Delany published a music book for the violin by Jaspar Robert Joly titled New and complete instructions, &c. for the violin. This was a reproduction of an earlier publication by Francesco Geminiani in 1790, to which was added a collection of airs, marches and rondos. Production of such work suggests that Delany already had his own business established by then. In 1801, Delany is listed as working on the North side of Dublin city at 17 Great Britain Street (now Parnell Street), where he remained until 1809.

=== Partnership and later career: 1810–1838 ===
In 1810, Delany either moved his business to 18 Great Britain Street, or the building that he had previously occupied (no. 17) was renumbered. Around this time, Delany published another music book for the German flute, titled The compleat tutor for the German flute containing the best and easiest instructions for learners to obtain a proficiency. This was also a reproduction of an earlier publication by John Simpson in 1746 which included Italian, English and Scotch tunes. Delany's publication also included Irish tunes. By 1814, Delany had moved premises to 31 Great Britain Street, where his business would remain for the rest of his working life.

In 1821, Delany entered into a partnership with his nephew, Cornelius Gannon. Gannon was from a craftsmen family of carpenters, many of whom would go on to work in the Guinness Brewery. Gannon's great-grandson, Cathal Gannon, would later become a renowned Irish harpsichord maker and fortepiano restorer. Delany later took on an apprentice named Daniel Compton. Delany died in 1838, at which time Compton was successor to the business and continued to operate out of 31 Great Britain Street.

== Style and technique ==
Delany's style of violin making evolved throughout his career. Some of his earlier instruments were based on the Stainer model and have a dull brown varnish and wide F-holes with exaggerated styling, typical of the early Irish school. His later instruments were based on the Amati model, which his mentor, Perry, had adopted around the time of his apprenticeship. Perry is said to have studied directly from an Amati instrument lent to him by the Duke of Leinster. It is possible that Delany was also influenced by Panormo's style during his time spent working at the Perry firm, which was also of the Amati school. Delany's later violins tend to have a lighter golden brown varnish, probably influenced by Perry's later 'golden amber' violins, or that of Panormo's. Delany branded his instruments externally 'DELANY/DUBLIN' at the back below the button, a signature of the Irish school.

According to Rev. William Meredith Morris, who published the book British Violin Makers, Delany's instruments were "well made" and produced a "clear and sweet tone".

The Irish violin-making school

Thomas Molineux c. 1700–1757
Patrick Harford fl. 1730–1752 | Martyn Molineux c. 1720–? | John Perry I c. 1710–1787 | George Ward c. 1715–1769 | John Ward c. 1703–1778
Thomas Perry c. 1738–1818
James Perry c. 1759–1810 | John Delany c. 1769–1838 | William Ringwood c. 1769–1842 | Richard Tobin c. 1766–1847 | William Wilkinson c. 1767–1830 | John Mackintosh c. 1780–1841
Daniel Compton ?–? | Arthur Ringwood c. 1812–1860 | George Tobin c. 1809–1861

- solid lines = Pere-Fils
- dashed lines = Maitre-Eleve

== Labels ==
Delany's instruments have become known for their unusual variety of labels, some of which are short, others long and expressive. His short labels typically follow the standard format of maker, place and year, for example: 'Made by John Delany, No.17 Britain Street, Dublin, 1808'. Delany's longer labels, on the other hand, express his strong sense of nationalism. An example of one of his long labels, written the year after the 1798 Rebellion, reads:

Made by John Delany,
No.11 Townsend St, Dublin,
Nov^{br} 5^{th}, 1799.
Liberty & Equality to all the world.

Another example of one of his long labels, commonly quoted in books, reads:

Made by John Delany,
in order to perpetuate his memory in future ages.
Dublin, 1808.
Liberty to all the world, black and white.

== Legacy ==
Delany's unusually expressive labels have led to much interest and intrigue amongst historians and violin enthusiasts. As a result, his labels have been featured in some of the earliest books on violin making and its makers, including The History of The Violin, and Other Instruments Played on with the Bow from the Remotest Times to the Present, The Violin: Its Famous Makers and their Imitators, A Dictionary of Violin Makers, and British Violin Makers.

Delany also featured in a book by Matthew Doyle called Beneath the Eagle’s Wings. The book tells the story of a widower, Liam O'Callaghan, who is a violinist and purveyor of Irish traditional music. O'Callaghan is the owner of an old Delany violin that he inherited from his father. The instrument is described as being "plain in its nature and based on the Amati model". The book also describes one of Delany's characteristically long labels, similar to the second label above. It then goes on to describe O'Callaghan's fascination with Delany and his message:

Sometimes Liam sat with the instrument in his hands and glided his fingers over the inscription, tracing the letters with his index finger. As the first part of the inscription was almost certainly a call by the maker to be remembered after his death, Liam often wondered if Delany would be pleased to hear the music that he and his father had played by his creation.

Liam had also always loved the second message on the instrument and as a young boy had made an enquiry with his father as to why the maker had placed an inscription expressing such implicit sentiments on the back of the violin [...] It was inconceivable, his father had told him, that Delany could not have been aware of the ending of the Atlantic slave trade the previous year by the British Government and the brutal continuance of the institution of slavery that still existed in the maker’s world.

His father considered this second message to be a considerate and thoughtful effort at solidarity with those held in bondage, as well as an explicit protest against the policies of both the American Government domestically, and the British Government in their colonies.

== Personal life ==
It is not known if Delany ever married or had a family of his own. The fact that Daniel Compton took over the business after Delany's death suggests that he did not have any sons to pass it onto. Delany has been described as a "very erratic genius" and "an original egotist". He is known to have been a staunch Republican and supporter of Irish revolutionary, Wolfe Tone. This strong sense of nationalism was typical of Irishmen of the time and likely influenced by the growing republican movement in 18th-century Ireland that culminated in the 1798 Rebellion.

His strong nationalist views may also be linked to the Parnell family, who became known for their efforts to bring about emancipation in Ireland. Tinnakill, where the Delanys may have originated, is a place closely associated with the Parnells. In 1773, a Malachy Delany of Tinnakill is recorded as being an agent to Sir John Parnell. In the 1817 and 1818 Dublin Directories, a Malachy Delany is listed as working as a "Ladies' Shoe-maker" in the building next door to John Delany on Great Britain Street, which coincidentally was later renamed Parnell Street after Charles Stewart Parnell. It is uncertain whether this is the same Malachy Delany from Tinnakill or a close relative, but it is possible that there is a connection between them or their families.

== Extant instruments ==
It is unknown how many instruments Delany produced in his lifetime as he did not number them. Some of them still survive today and occasionally come up for sale or auction in various states of repair. Two of Delany's violins are preserved in the National Museum of Ireland as part of a collection of musical instruments by Irish makers. However, these particular examples are said not reflect his best work, being Stainer-like in style and unpurfled with a dull brown varnish.

Some of Delany's extant instruments:

=== Violins ===
- (?): National Museum of Ireland collection, Dublin
- (?): National Museum of Ireland collection, Dublin
- 1799: labelled 'Made by/John Delany/No.11 Townsend St/Dublin/Novbr. 5th, 1799/Liberty & Equality to all the world'
- c. 1800: unlabelled, branded 'DELANY/DUBLIN' beneath the button and 'DELANY' above the end pin, sold by Brompton's in March 2014 for £1,320 (Lot 186), LOB: 34.9 cm
- c. 1800: sold by Bonhams in November 2002 for £822 (Lot 201), LOB: 35.8 cm
- c. 1805: two-piece back, branded 'DELANY/DUBLIN' below the button, LOB: 35.3 cm
- 1808: referenced in numerous books, labelled 'Made by John Delany, No.17 Britain Street, Dublin, 1808'.
- c. 1820: unlabelled, branded externally 'DELANY/DUBLIN' beneath the button, sold by Bonhams in June 2020 for £225 (Lot 1176), LOB: 35.7 cm
- c. 1830: sold by Brompton's in October 2016 for £300 (Lot 59), LOB: 32.5 cm

=== Violas ===
- (?): branded 'DELANY/DUBLIN' beneath the button, for sale by Stringers in 2024 for £8,000, LOB: 37.8 cm

== Publications ==
- Joly, J. R. New and complete instructions, &c. for the violin:containing the easiest and best method for learners to obtain a proficiency on that instrument, with some useful directions, lessons, graces, &c. : to which is added a favorite collection of airs, marches, rondos, &c. : with several well adapted duets for two violins. Dublin: John Delany, 1800.
- The compleat tutor for the German flute containing the best and easiest instructions for learners to obtain a proficiency [microform] : to which is added a choice collection of the most celebrated Italian, English, Irish and Scotch tunes curiously adapted to that instrument. Also a dictionary explaining such words as generally occur in music. Dublin: John Delany, 1810.

== See also ==
- Thomas Perry (luthier)
- Vincenzo Panormo
- Cathal Gannon
