= John Edward Betts =

English instrument maker (1755–1823)

- Born: 1755; Stamford, Lincolnshire
- Died: 1823 (aged 67–68); London
- Occupation: Luthier

John Edward Betts (also known as John Betts I, 1755–1823) was an English luthier, a crafter of stringed instruments such as violins, cellos, guitars and harps. Betts, the leading instrument dealer of his time in London, was one of the first to import Italian instruments. He was born at Stamford, Lincolnshire and is buried at Cripplegate Church.

Betts apprenticed under Richard Duke starting in 1765 and eventually bought Duke's business from Duke's daughter. He started working independently by 1781, when he hired his first apprentice. Notable British craftsmen who worked for him include Bernard Simon Fendt, John Furber, Henry Lockey Hill, Joseph Hill II, Vincenzo Panormo, and Richard Tobin. Betts taught his craft to his younger brother Arthur, who inherited the business upon Betts' death in 1823. Under Arthur, the direction of the shop moved more towards the reproduction of historic instruments. After Arthur's sons Arthur II and John II inherited the family business the shop eventually closed in 1867.
