= Richard Tobin (luthier) =

Irish luthier (1766–1847)

- Risteárd Tóibín
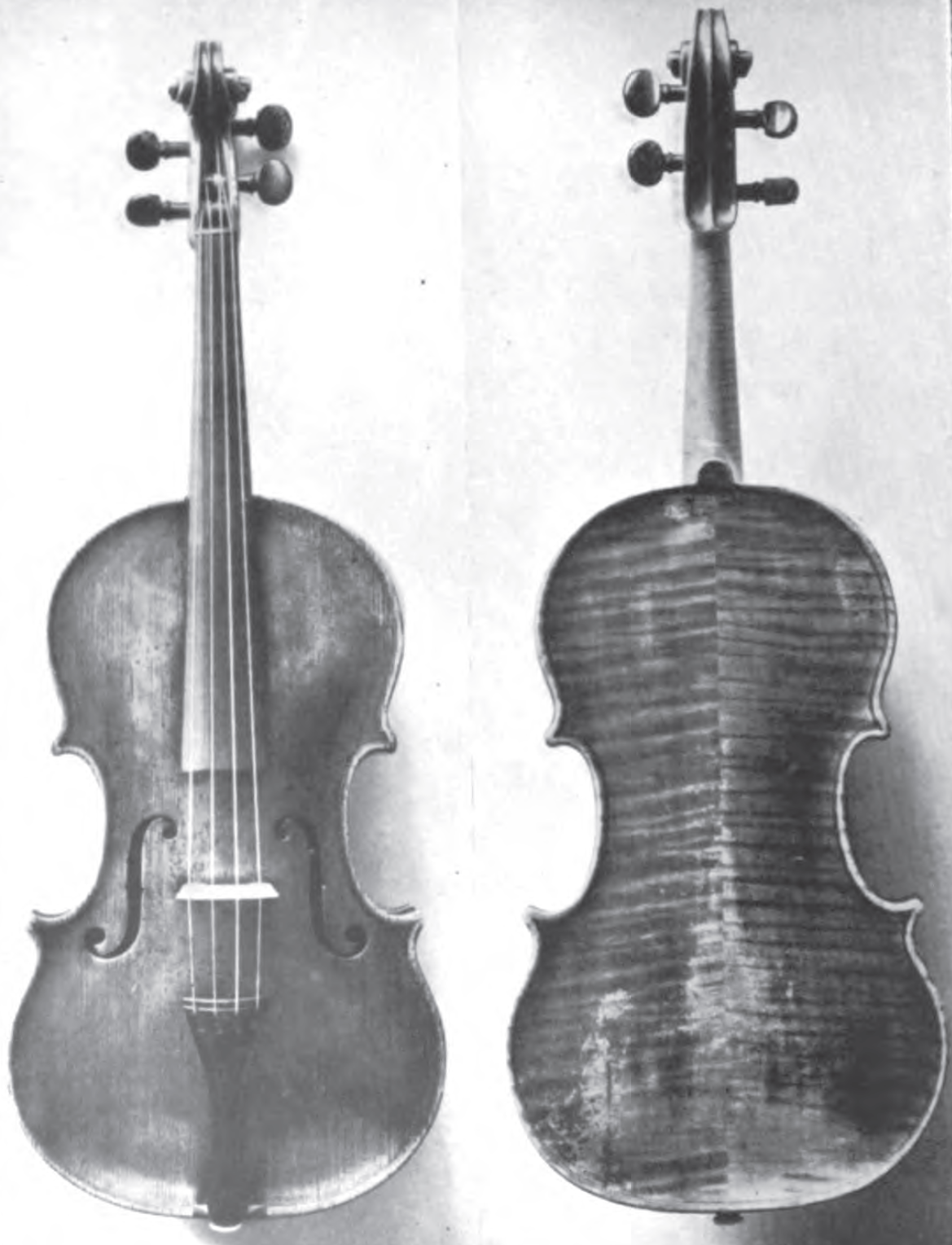
- Violin by Tobin, published in 1920
- Born: 1766; Dublin, Ireland
- Died: December 1847 (aged 80–81); Middlesex, London
- Education: Thomas Perry
- Known for: Luthier; scroll carving
- Notable work: Pantel Violin (1820, London); Beare Viola (1820, London); Mesa Cello (1820, London)
- Style: Amati style; Guarneri style; Perry style; Stainer style; Stradivari style
- Movement: Irish school; English school
- Spouse: Elizabeth Daley
- Children: George (son); John (son); Elizabeth (daughter); Esther (daughter)
- Parent: Richard Tobin (father)

Richard Tobin (Irish: Risteárd Tóibín; 1766 – December 1847) was an Irish luthier and maker of violins, violas, cellos and pochettes. Tobin's work was largely uncredited, often branded under the names of his employers and other shops that enlisted him for his sought-after workmanship. As a luthier, he has been described as "a genius". As well as being known for the quality of his instruments, Tobin is famous for the workmanship of his scrolls, of which it has been said "never did Antonio Stradivari cut better".

== Early life ==
Tobin was born near Dublin around 1766. Musicologist Brian Boydell suggested that he was probably born in Waterford, possibly because of the connection with some of his earlier instruments. However, luthier and historian Rev. William Meredith Morris states that "according to his own account he [Tobin] was born a few miles out of Dublin". The year in which Tobin was born has also been debated, with estimates varying from as early as 1760 to as late as 1777. Burial and workhouse records from the UK National Archives confirm that Tobin was born in 1766.

Tobin is said to have developed a love for the violin in early childhood from hearing it being played at parties and wakes. He started making violins as a young boy out of boxes and scrap wood. Rev. Morris describes how at the age of fourteen, Tobin made a fairly good instrument out of a willow block and sold it to a neighbouring fiddle player. The neighbour is said to have brought the instrument to the attention of renowned Dublin luthier, Thomas Perry, who was so impressed with its workmanship that he decided to take Tobin on as his apprentice.

It is not known who Tobin's parents were, or where they were from. A violin from Tobin's time at the Perry firm inscribed 'Richard Tobin Junior' suggests that he may have been named after his father. However, it is possible that Tobin appended 'Junior' to his name to indicate that he was an apprentice at the time.

== Career ==
=== Apprenticeship and early career: 1783–1810 ===
Tobin apprenticed with the renowned Dublin luthier Thomas Perry around 1783–1790. One instrument bearing his label gives Waterford as his residence in 1800. Tobin is believed to have worked briefly for Bartholomew Murphy of Cork shortly afterwards and is listed at Patrick St., Cork in 1805. He then worked independently before moving to London on the advice of Vincenzo Panormo, who had earlier worked for Perry.

=== London and later career: 1810–1847 ===
Tobin's earliest London work is dated 1810 and appears to have been made under the aegis of Henry Lockey Hill. A violin dated 1817 is signed ‘R. Tobin for L. Hill’ internally. He was established in St Leonard Street, Finsbury Square, and from 1823 in his own premises at 9 West Street, Soho. Tobin's son, George, was apprenticed to him around 1823–1830 and was an active violin maker around 1830–1840, but has mistakenly been recorded as "James Tobin" by historians. Like his father, George's work is very rarely identified and generally unlabelled, and he is thought to have worked exclusively for other violin makers and dealers.

== Style and technique ==
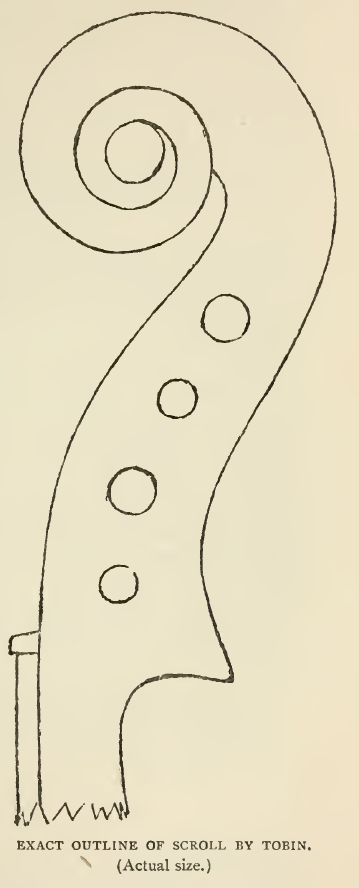
Outline of Tobin scroll published in British Violin Makers, 1904

Richard Tobin's workmanship is considered accurate and finely finished in classical Italian styles. The few instruments which bear his label are typically copies of Amati or Stradivari violins, and they are said to have a rich and mellow tone. The varnish on Tobin violins varies considerably as he often supplied shops with unvarnished instruments or used the varnish provided by the shop he was working in at the time.

Tobin is regarded as one of the greatest ever scroll carvers, and his hand can be recognized on many instruments with the shop label of John Betts, Thomas Dodd, Samuel Gilkes and Henry Lockey Hill. Such was the quality of his scrolls that an outline of one was included in Rev. Morris' 1904 book British Violin Makers. Despite his meticulous workmanship, he is said to have worked very fast, and apparently could finish a scroll inside of two hours. Some of his instruments were signed internally on the table and occasionally branded below the back button, although authentic Tobin labels are extremely rare.

The Irish violin-making school

Thomas Molineux c. 1700–1757
Patrick Harford fl. 1730–1752	Martyn Molineux c. 1720–?	John Perry I c. 1710–1787	George Ward c. 1715–1769	John Ward c. 1703–1778
Thomas Perry c. 1738–1818
James Perry c. 1759–1810	John Delany c. 1769–1838	William Ringwood c. 1769–1842	Richard Tobin c. 1766–1847	William Wilkinson c. 1767–1830	John Mackintosh c. 1780–1841
Daniel Compton ?–?	Arthur Ringwood c. 1812–1860	George Tobin c. 1809–1861

- solid lines = Pere-Fils
- dashed lines = Maitre-Eleve

== Personal life ==
Tobin married an Irish woman named Elizabeth Daley (born c. 1777) in Cork around the time he was working for Bartholomew Murphy. They had at least 4 children, George (born c. 1809 in Cork), John (born 6 Dec 1811 in London), Elizabeth (born 18 January 1815 in London) and Esther (born c. 1838 in London). On 8 Dec 1816, Tobin baptised two of his children, John and Elizabeth, in St Leonard's, Shoreditch and the family is recorded as living at Leonard Street in Shoreditch. On 24 May 1818, Tobin's younger son, John, died at only 6 years of age. By 1841, Tobin was living with his wife and two daughters at 65 New Compton Street in St Giles, London, according to the UK Census. He is recorded as being aged 70, suggesting that he was born 1771. However, it is likely that his age was estimated incorrectly by another individual in his absence.

The parish of St Giles where they lived had a reputation for poverty and some of the worst living conditions in London at the time. It is possible that Tobin ended up in that part of London because of his connection to Panormo, who had also settled there with his two youngest sons. Panormo's son, Louis, later set up his shop in the area, as did French luthier, Georges Chanot III. To this day, the surrounding area of Soho in London is known for its violin makers and sellers, including Tarisio, J & A Beare, Ingles & Hayday, Bishop Instruments & Bows and Stringers of London.

Tobin was thought to be eccentric and intemperate, often trying the temper of his employers. He was known to go through extended periods of heavy drinking, until all his savings were spent after which he would remain sober for several months until he had saved up enough money again. He failed to sustain himself as a luthier in later life, ending up in Shoreditch poorhouse in 1845. He died in early December, 1847 and was buried in a pauper's grave in St Leonard's, Shoreditch on 7 December 1847.

== Extant instruments ==
It is unknown how many instruments Tobin produced in his lifetime. Some of them still survive today and occasionally come up for sale or auction, others are housed as part of collections or exhibits. However, many more are likely uncredited or branded under the names of his employers or their shops. One of his violins, made in London c. 1820, is now part of The Harrison-Frank Family Foundation collection and is currently on loan to violinist Emma Pantel. One of Tobin's cellos, currently played by Thomas Mesa, was used to record soundtracks for the first movies ever created. One of his pochettes (also known as a kit or dance master's fiddle) is currently housed in the National Music Museum, Vermillion, South Dakota.

Some of Tobin's notable instruments:

=== Violins ===
- 1789: Dublin, Labelled 'Made by Thos. Perry, 6 Anglesea Street, Dublin, No. 533, 1789', inscribed internally 'Richard Tobin Junior' on the inner table and inner bottom rib.
- c. 1800 (No. 407): Waterford, Labelled 'Made by Richard Tobin, Mus. Instr. Maker, Waterford'
- c. 1805: Cork, branded externally 'TOBIN/CORK' beneath the button.
- 1810: London, unlabelled (Cozio 104007).
- c. 1820: London, unlabelled (Cozio 104008).
- c. 1820: London, The Harrison-Frank Family Foundation collection, used by Emma Pantel

=== Violas ===
- c. 1820: London, unlabelled (Cozio 10059)
- c. 1820: London, stamped internally 'TOBIN, LONDON'

=== Cellos ===
- 1820: London, used to record soundtracks for the first movies ever created, previously used by Thomas Mesa
- c. 1820: London, unlabelled, for sale for £115,000

=== Pochettes ===
- c. 1800: National Music Museum collection, Vermillion, South Dakota
