= William Ringwood =

Irish luthier (c.1769–1842)

- Uilliam Ringwood
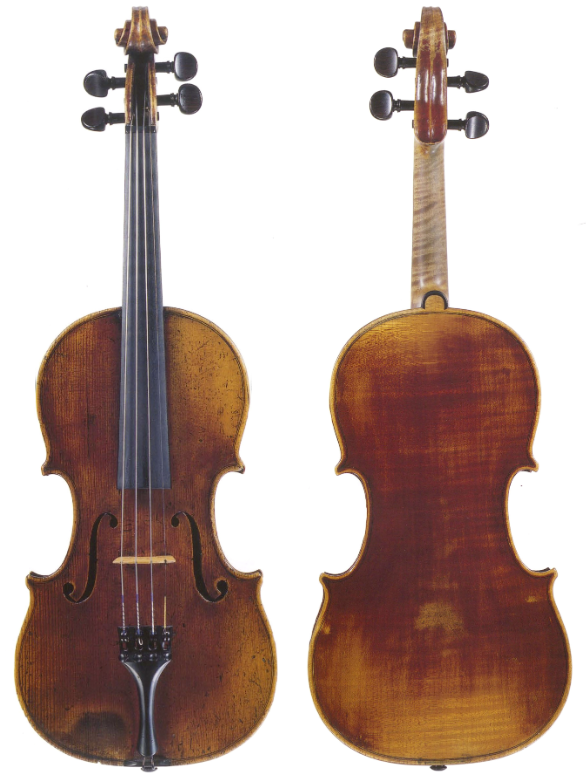
- Violin by Ringwood, c. 1800
- Born: c. 1769; Dublin, Ireland
- Died: c. 1842; Dublin, Ireland
- Education: Thomas Perry
- Known for: Luthier
- Style: Amati style; Stradivari style
- Movement: Irish school
- Children: Arthur Ringwood (son)
- Parents: Arthur Ringwood (father); Mary Cross (mother)

William Ringwood (Irish: Uilliam Ringwood; c. 1769 – 1842) was an Irish luthier and professor from Dublin. He was a apprentice and associate of the firm Perry & Wilkinson, before setting up his own business with John Wheatley, and later his son, Arthur Ringwood. The style of his instruments were based on the Amati and Stradivari models.

== Early life ==
Based on the year he began his apprenticeship, Ringwood is thought to have been born in Dublin around 1769 to Arthur Ringwood, an "eminent painter" from Nicholas Street, Dublin, and Mary Cross of Cole Alley, Dublin. It is also possible that he was born later, in the year 1771, as he is recorded as still being an apprentice in deeds dated 1793. Arthur and Mary Ringwood were married on 20 April 1769, which supports either date of birth. Later in life, Ringwood would name his first son Arthur, which further supports the connection to his presumed parents. There is also evidence of a William Ringwood residing in Cole Alley in 1774, who was a builder and a master of the Guild of Bricklayers. This may have been a grandfather or uncle to Ringwood.

It is therefore likely that Ringwood grew up on either Nicholas Street or Cole Alley, both of which are close to the Christ Church area where the Perry family resided at the time and whom he would later apprentice with. Furthermore, the Ringwood and Perry families were evidently very close as there are records of several marriages between the two families in later years, as well as a joint Perry and Ringwood family vault, built in Mount Jerome Cemetery, Dublin in 1844.

== Career ==
=== Apprenticeship and early career: 1783–1793 ===
Ringwood began his career as a luthier in Dublin in the early 1780s. He was apprenticed to renowned Dublin maker Thomas Perry at 6 Anglesea Street between 1783 and 1790. There, Ringwood learned his trade as a violin maker alongside another one of Perry's great apprentices, Richard Tobin, and Perry's nephew and later son-in-law, William Wilkinson. Much of what we know about Ringwood's time at the Perry firm comes from the Registry of Deeds. On 20 June 1785, his mentor Perry renewed the lease of his house and workshop on Anglesea Street. The deed was witnessed and signed by Ringwood, who is referred to as "apprentice to Thomas Perry". In 1789, Perry took his son-in-law and nephew, Wilkinson, into partnership and the firm became known as 'Perry & Wilkinson'. On 22 February 1793, Perry took out another lease on the same property and Ringwood is again recorded as a witness, referred to as "apprentice to the said Thomas Perry". This puts into question the year in which Ringwood started his apprenticeship with Perry, pushing it back to 1785 at the latest, or suggests that it took Ringwood longer than the standard 7 years to complete his apprenticeship.

=== Associate of the firm: 1793–1818 ===
After his apprenticeship, Ringwood became an associate of the firm and remained at Anglesea Street until Perry's death in 1818. During this time, Ringwood would have overlapped with some of Perry's other great apprentices, such as John Delany, who began working at the firm in 1796 and John Mackintosh, who joined in 1808. Ringwood also would have worked with renowned Italian luthier, Vincenzo Panormo, who came to Dublin in 1799 and spent a few years working for Perry. Panormo's influence can be seen in Ringwood's later work which is closer to the Stradivari model. Ringwood had a son, Arthur (born c. 1812), who apprenticed with him to become a violin maker, as well as being a notable musician. Ringwood is recorded as being a witness to Perry's last will and testament, which he signed it on 7 June 1818. Thomas Perry died in November later that year.

=== Partnership and later career: 1818–1842 ===
After Perry's death, Ringwood set up in partnership with another maker, John Wheatley, and developed what was described as a "prosperous dealing business", employing several assistants to make instruments for them. This partnership may only have lasted until around 1825. Ringwood is recorded by Brian Boydell as having worked as a professor of music in Waterford around 1824. Ringwood later worked as a luthier on his own account and is listed as having lived and worked at addresses such as 150 Abbey Street in 1830 and 1831, 27 Mary Street in 1832, 15 Abbey Street 1833, 16 Fownes Street 1841, and 14 Fownes Street in 1842. It is believed that he was active as a maker/dealer until his death in c. 1842. Ringwood's son, Arthur, succeeded him at 14 Fownes Street after his death and established his own business as a maker.

== Style and technique ==
As he spent much of his life working for the firms of Thomas Perry and Perry & Wilkinson, it is difficult to assess Ringwood's individual ability as a maker. Those that are identifiable as Ringwood's are considered "of a very fine order" and he is regarded as "one of Perry's most talented apprentices". Ringwood's later instruments are similar in style to that of Nicola Amati, whose violins had a big influence on the Irish school. He may have studied directly from an Amati instrument, as it is believed that his mentor, Perry, was lent one by the Duke of Leinster. It is possible that Ringwood was also influenced by Panormo's style, which was also of the Amati school, and who made instruments for the Duke of Leinster while in Dublin. However, some of Ringwood's work has been described as "very refined Panormo-like work on Stradivari model". His instruments were typically finished in a thin red-brown varnish of "very good quality".

The Irish violin-making school

Thomas Molineux c. 1700–1757
Patrick Harford fl. 1730–1752	Martyn Molineux c. 1720–?	John Perry I c. 1710–1787	George Ward c. 1715–1769	John Ward c. 1703–1778
Thomas Perry c. 1738–1818
James Perry c. 1759–1810	John Delany c. 1769–1838	William Ringwood c. 1769–1842	Richard Tobin c. 1766–1847	William Wilkinson c. 1767–1830	John Mackintosh c. 1780–1841
Daniel Compton ?–?	Arthur Ringwood c. 1812–1860	George Tobin c. 1809–1861

- solid lines = Pere-Fils
- dashed lines = Maitre-Eleve

== Extant instruments ==
It is not known how many instruments Ringwood produced in his lifetime. His name is sometimes seen in Perry's instruments, and his later instruments were likely the work of his assistants. A very fine red-varnished violin by Ringwood was played for many years by Irish violinist Thérèse Timoney.

Some of Ringwood's extant instruments:

- c. 1800: Dublin, sold by Tarisio (Cozio 104002)
- (?): Dublin, previously in the William Hofmann collection, used by Thérèse Timoney in the 1970s

== See also ==
- John Delany (luthier)
- John Mackintosh (luthier)
- Vincenzo Panormo
- Thomas Perry (luthier)
- Richard Tobin (luthier)
