= Benjamin Banks =

Benjamin Banks may refer to:

- Ben B. Banks (born 1932), American leader in The Church of Jesus Christ of Latter-day Saints
- Benjamin Banks (cricketer) (born 1969), English cricketer
- Benjamin Banks (violin maker) (1727–1795), English violin-maker
