= Thomas Molineux (luthier) =

Irish luthier

- Tomás Ó Maoileagáin
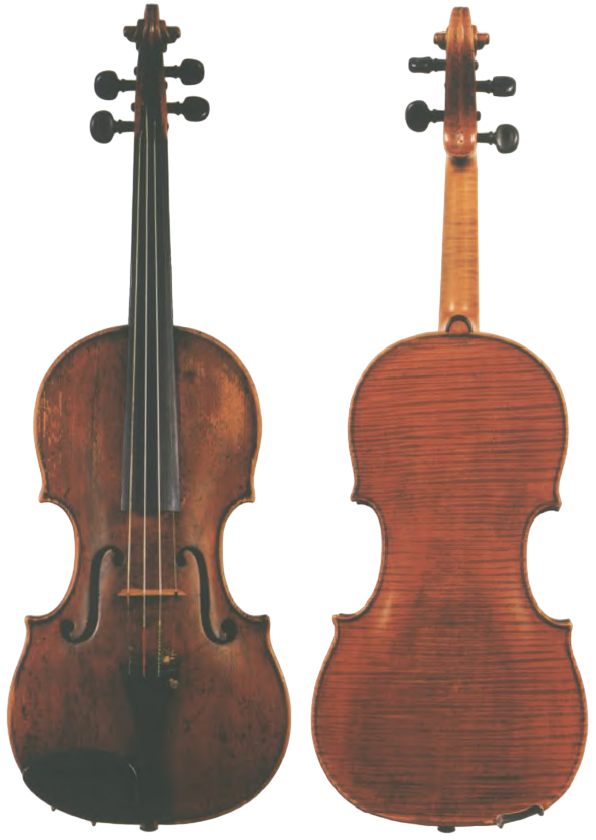
- Violin by Molineux, c. 1750
- Born: c. 1700
- Died: 25 January 1757; Dublin, Ireland
- Known for: Luthier
- Notable work: violin, NMI collection
- Style: Italian style
- Movement: Irish school
- Children: Martyn Molineux (son)

Thomas Molineux or Thomas Molyneux (Irish: Tomás Ó Maoileagáin; c. 1700 – 25 January 1757) was an Irish luthier and maker of violins from Dublin. His instruments are some of the oldest surviving Irish violins, one of which is housed as part of a collection in the National Museum of Ireland, Dublin.

== Early life ==
Very little is known about Molineux's early life. It is thought that he was born some time before 1700. Rev. Father Greaven, an expert on 18th and 19th century Irish violin makers, thought that he was a foreigner who had settled down in Dublin in early life. It has also been suggested that he may have been of Huguenot descendent. However, the name Molineux (or Molyneux) can be found in many 17th and 18th century records of County Dublin and County Laois. It is likely that Molineux was from a Church of Ireland family, either from Dublin, or originally landowners from County Laois, like so many other Irish luthier families of the time such as the Delany's, Perry's, Ward's and Wilkinson's. It has been suggested that many of these families were originally close neighbours or even related to each other, explaining why so many of them ended up in the same part of Dublin city and subsequently apprenticed to one another.

== Career ==
=== Apprenticeship and early career: 1710–1739 ===
Molineux likely began a formal apprenticeship around the age of 14, which would have taken at least 7 years to complete, as was required by the Carpenters' Guild of the City of Dublin in those days. Based on his earliest identified instrument, his apprenticeship probably took place some time between 1710 and 1739 in an area of Dublin then known as Christchurch Yard (now part of the grounds of Christ Church Cathedral). There are several violin makers recorded as working in this part of Dublin during these years that Molineux could have apprenticed with. One possible candidate is John Neal, who was an active instrument maker and music seller in Christchurch Lane between 1701–1721 and Christchurch Yard between 1721 and 1740. He is considered the first known maker of violins in Ireland. Another candidate is Thomas Dunn, who was working as a violin maker in Christchurch Lane in 1740. Unfortunately, neither of their violins are known to survive and so it is not possible to make a connection based on the style of their instruments.

Molineux's earliest identified instrument is a violin dated 1739, described in Sotheby's 1973 Catalogue of Important Musical Instruments as "an Irish Division Viol". It is presumed, however, that Molineux was active earlier than this date. He worked in an area of Christchurch Yard known as 'Hell' due to an oak wood carving of the devil above the arched entrance. Despite its name, Hell was said to be an attractive place consisting of toy shops, taverns and boarding houses. It was also an area that was to become synonymous with violin making in 18th-century Dublin, attracting other notable luthier families such as the Neal's, Dunn's, Ward's and Perry's.

=== Later career: 1740–1757 ===
It has been proposed by some historians that Molineux may have been the teacher of famous Dublin luthier, Thomas Perry, although the style of their instruments is quite different. Perry's earlier instruments are considered Stainer-like in style, which does not fit with the Italian style of Molineux's instruments. Perry and his father, John, were working as luthiers in Christchurch Yard by 1760, if not earlier, and so it is possible that Molineux knew and interacted with both of them at the very least. Another theory is that Molineux was a teacher to George Ward, who is more likely to have been Perry's teacher based on the similarities between their instruments. Ward also started his business out of Christchurch Yard and so it is quite possible that he learned his trade from Molineux. Furthermore, Ward branded his instruments at the back in the same manner as Molineux. Molineux is said to have had a son, Martyn, who also became a well-known violin maker in Dublin. It is possible that Martyn apprenticed with his father, or with another luthier in the area. Molineux died on 25 January of 1757, his obituary recorded in Faulkner's Dublin Journal as "Death: In Christchurch-yard, Mr. Thomas Molineaux, Fiddle-maker".

== Style and technique ==
Molineux's style has been described as Italian in character. It is not known if he had the opportunity to study Italian instruments directly, or if he adopted this particular style from his teacher. Whether he was the first Irish luthier to adopt such a style or not, this Italian influence would become a defining feature of the Irish school of violin-making over the next century. Molineux has been described as an "assured and confident maker", and his instruments of "capital design" and "refined workmanship".

Molineux branded his instruments externally 'MOLINEUX/DUBLIN' at the back below the button, a trait that would be adopted by generations of Irish luthiers and become a signature of the Irish school. It is not known if he inherited this trait from his teacher, from the instruments of other makers such as Jacob Stainer and Richard Duke, or from another instrument-making tradition in the area such as pipemaking.

The Irish violin-making school

Thomas Molineux c. 1700–1757
John Perry I c. 1710–1787	Martyn Molineux c. 1720–?	George Ward c. 1715–1769	John Ward c. 1703–1778
Thomas Perry c. 1738–1818
James Perry c. 1759–1810	John Delany c. 1769–1838	William Ringwood c. 1769–1842	Richard Tobin c. 1766–1847	William Wilkinson c. 1767–1830	John Mackintosh c. 1780–1841
Daniel Compton ?–?	Arthur Ringwood c. 1812–1860	George Tobin c. 1809–1861

- solid lines = Pere-Fils
- dashed lines = Maitre-Eleve

== Extant instruments ==
It is not known how many instruments Molineux produced in his lifetime. One of his finest violins is preserved in the National Museum of Ireland as part of a collection of musical instruments by Irish makers. The collection also includes instruments by John Delany, John Mackintosh, Thomas Perry and George Ward.

Some of Molineux's extant instruments:

- 1739: earliest identified instrument, private collection
- (?): branded 'MOLINEUX/DUBLIN', private collection
- (?): National Museum of Ireland, Dublin

== See also ==
- Thomas Perry (Irish luthier)
- George Ward (Irish luthier)
