= Richard Duke (violin maker) =

English violin maker and music publisher

Richard Duke (December 3, 1718 – February 21, 1783) was an English violin maker and music publisher.

== Life and career ==
Born in Holborn, London, the beginning of Duke's life was centered in that district of his native city. There the earliest records of his violin making date to instruments crafted in 1743. While his shop produced instruments of varying quality from superior to poor, the best instruments he produced are widely regarded as the finest violins made in England during the 18th century. In particular, Duke made several instruments modeled after a violin he owned that was created in 1692 by Antonio Stradivari. These violins are considered his best work, and are highly valued today.

In 1765 Duke expanded his business into the area of music publishing; partnering with the publisher Henry Thorowgood. In 1768 he became the official instrument maker for Prince William Henry, Duke of Gloucester and Edinburgh. Thorowgood provided Duke with private lodgings in Old Gloucester Street and workshops in Gloucester Place. There his business remained until his death on February 21, 1783, when his apprentice, John Edward Betts, took over his business. Duke's son, a violin maker also named Richard Duke, was largely disinherited in his father's will. The business passed to Betts through Duke's daughter Anne.

After Duke's death, his work was widely imitated well into the 19th century. Factories in Germany appropriated the stamp ‘DUKE, LONDON' in an attempt to capitalize on the reputation of Duke's name as a violin maker; producing many cheaply made inferior instruments. Other violin makers also tried to imitate and appropriate his name in England; none of which reached the quality of Duke's better violins. Violin expert Charles Beare wrote, that "Duke has been flattered and at the same time insulted by 19th-century imitations of his work."
