= Thomas Perry (luthier) =

Irish luthier (c.1738–1818)

- Tomás de Poire
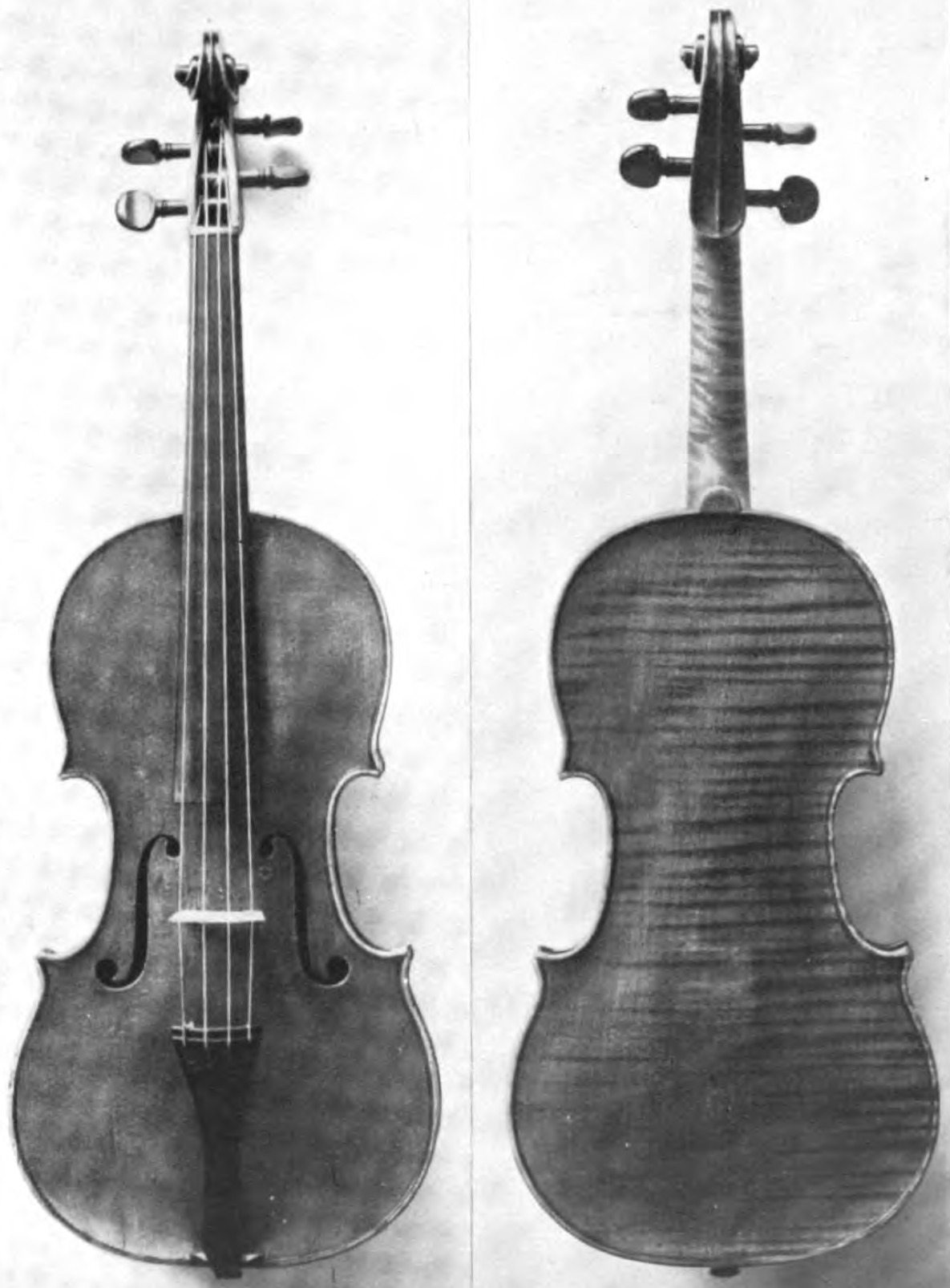
- Violin by Perry, (Morris, 1920, p. 239)
- Born: c. 1738; County Laois, Ireland
- Died: November 1818 (aged 79–80); Dublin, Ireland
- Education: John Perry (father); George Ward
- Known for: Luthier; cither viol
- Notable work: The Papini Perry (c. 1780); The Trimble Perry (1769); The Takeuchi Perry (c. 1770); Cruise Collection (c. 1780)
- Style: Amati style; Stainer style; Perry style
- Movement: Irish school
- Spouse: Elizabeth Smyth (m. 1766)
- Relatives: James Perry (brother); John Perry (brother); Joseph Perry (cousin); William Wilkinson (nephew)

Thomas Perry (Irish: Tomás de Poire; c. 1738 – November 1818) was an Irish luthier who introduced a type of bowed psaltery known as the cither viol or sultana. He is regarded as one of Ireland's most influential violin makers and is often referred to as 'The Irish Stradivari'. Perry's output was quite prolific and his shop has been credited with making over 4,000 instruments. His violins are usually numbered on the button and inscribed just below the button "PERRY DUBLIN".

== Biography ==
Perry was probably born in County Laois, Ireland to John Perry, an established violin maker (died 1787), and worked in the Temple Bar of Dublin.

== Career ==
Perry followed in the footsteps of his father, and began working as a luthier in his shop in Dublin. His earliest documented violin is dated 1764. Perry took over his fathers shop around 1766 and by 1770, Perry had established his business in nearby Anglesea Street. Perry operated the business until he died in 1818. His will indicates that he left his finished and unfinished instruments to his son-in-law, William Wilkinson, along with his working implements and his stock-in-trade. After Perry's death, Wilkinson operated the business under the name of 'Perry and Wilkinson'.

Thomas Perry numbered all his violins and is known to have made more than 4,000. As well as making first-class violins, Perry also made violas, cellos and at least one double-bass, some of which are in the collection of the National Museum of Ireland. He invented the cither-viol or sultana in the 1760s and was renowned for the quality and beauty of his instruments. Tradition has it that Perry was able to copy an Amati lent to him by the Duke of Leinster, but his other models are of a more Tyrolean type or reminiscent of the work of Richard Duke in London.

The violin maker Richard Tobin, who later set up business in London, was one of his apprentices, and Vincenzo Panormo worked with Perry prior to moving to London. His pupils included violin makers John Delany, John Mackintosh, William Ringwood, and William Wilkinson (1771-1838), who married Perry's eldest daughter Elizabeth in June 1794 and carried on the business after Perry's death until 1839.

The Irish violin-making school

Thomas Molineux c. 1700–1757
Patrick Harford fl. 1730–1752	Martyn Molineux c. 1720–?	John Perry I c. 1710–1787	George Ward c. 1715–1769	John Ward c. 1703–1778
Thomas Perry c. 1738–1818
James Perry c. 1759–1810	John Delany c. 1769–1838	William Ringwood c. 1769–1842	Richard Tobin c. 1766–1847	William Wilkinson c. 1767–1830	John Mackintosh c. 1780–1841
Daniel Compton ?–?	Arthur Ringwood c. 1812–1860	George Tobin c. 1809–1861

- solid lines = Pere-Fils
- dashed lines = Maitre-Eleve

== Instrument list ==
=== Violins ===
- 1764 (no. 35): The Leixlip Perry, earliest identified Perry instrument
- 1768 (no. 408): last identified from Christ Church Yard
- c. 1770 (no. ?): The Longford Perry
- c. 1770 (no. 418): sold by Tarisio in 2011 (Cozio 23823)
- c.1770 (no. 441) Private Collection: sold by Kenneth Stein Violins in 2018 to private collector, www.steinviolins.com.
- 1771 (no. 540): earliest identified from Anglesea Street
- 1772 (no. 535): sold by Sotheby's on 22 March 1994
- 1780 (no. ?): The Papini Perry, formerly Cruise collection, used by Guido Papini, National Museum of Ireland, Dublin
- 1780 (no. ?): Cruise Violin II, formerly Cruise collection, National Museum of Ireland, Dublin
- 1782 (no. 1144)
- 1792 (no. 1709)
- 1795 (no. 2084)
- c. 1800 (no. 3440): Sotheby's auction catalogue, 22 November 1984, lot 95
- 1822 (no. ?): Florian Leonhard collection, used by Deniz Şensoy

=== Cither viols & sultanas ===
- 1767: National Museum of Ireland, Dublin
- 1767: Victoria and Albert Museum, London
- c. 1767: Springer Sisters collection, Kent
- 1769: The Trimble Perry, Gerald Trimble collection
- 1770: National Museum of Ireland, Dublin
- c. 1790: Gerald Trimble collection
- c. 1790: Stearns collection, University of Michigan, Michigan
- 1792: National Museums Liverpool
- 1794: Museum of Fine Arts, Boston
- 1802: National Museum of Ireland, Dublin

=== Viola d'amores ===
- 1777 (no. 030): National Museum of Ireland, Dublin
- 1801 (no. 2038): National Museum of Ireland, Dublin

=== Cellos & double basses ===
- (?): Cruise Cello, formerly Cruise collection, National Museum of Ireland, Dublin
- (?): Perry Bass, only identified double bass by Perry, National Museum of Ireland, Dublin

=== Guittars ===
- c. 1770: The Takeuchi Perry, Taro Takeuchi collection
- 1790: National Museum of Ireland, Dublin [1913.397]
- (?): National Museum of Ireland, Dublin [1908.17]
- (?): Victoria and Albert Museum, Dublin [222-1882]
- (?): Sotheby's auction catalogue, 22 May 1986, lot 186, p. 174
- (?): Phillips auction catalogue, 14 September 1978, lot 41, p. 12
- (?): Sotheby's auction catalogue, 14 February 1974, lot 34, p. 10

=== Pochettes ===
- c. 1790: National Music Museum, South Dakota
- (?): National Museum of Ireland, Dublin

== See also ==
- John Delany (Irish luthier)
- John Mackintosh (Irish luthier)
- Thomas Molineux (Irish luthier)
- George Ward (Irish luthier)
