= Anglesea Street, Dublin =

Street in central Dublin, Ireland

Anglesea Street
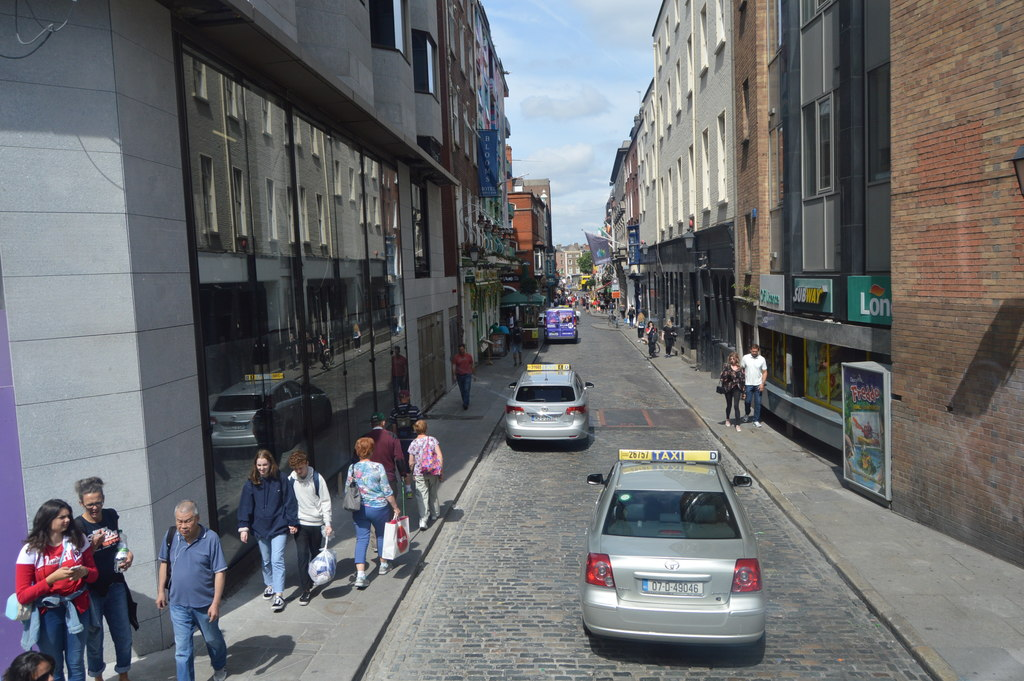
- Southern end of the street

- Location within Central Dublin
- Native name: Sráid Anglesea (Irish)
- Namesake: Arthur Annesley, 1st Earl of Anglesey
- Length: 150 m (490 ft)
- Width: 8.5 metres (28 ft)
- Location: Dublin, Ireland
- Postal code: D02
- Coordinates: 53.345017°N 6.2618376°W
- north end: Fleet Street, Bedford Row
- Major junctions: Cope Street
- south end: College Green

Construction
- Completion: 1740s–50s

Other
- Known for: Irish Stock Exchange, Georgian architecture, luthiers

Anglesea Street (Irish: Sráid Anglesea) is a Georgian street in the Temple Bar area of central Dublin, Ireland.

== Location ==
Anglesea Street runs straight north–south from Fleet Street (junction with Bedford Row), meeting Cope Street and continuing south to College Green and Dame Street where Daly's Club would have been located.

Originally the street would have been connected to Turnstile Alley (now Foster Place) via an alley named Blackmore Yard until this route was built upon at the beginning of the 19th century.

== History ==
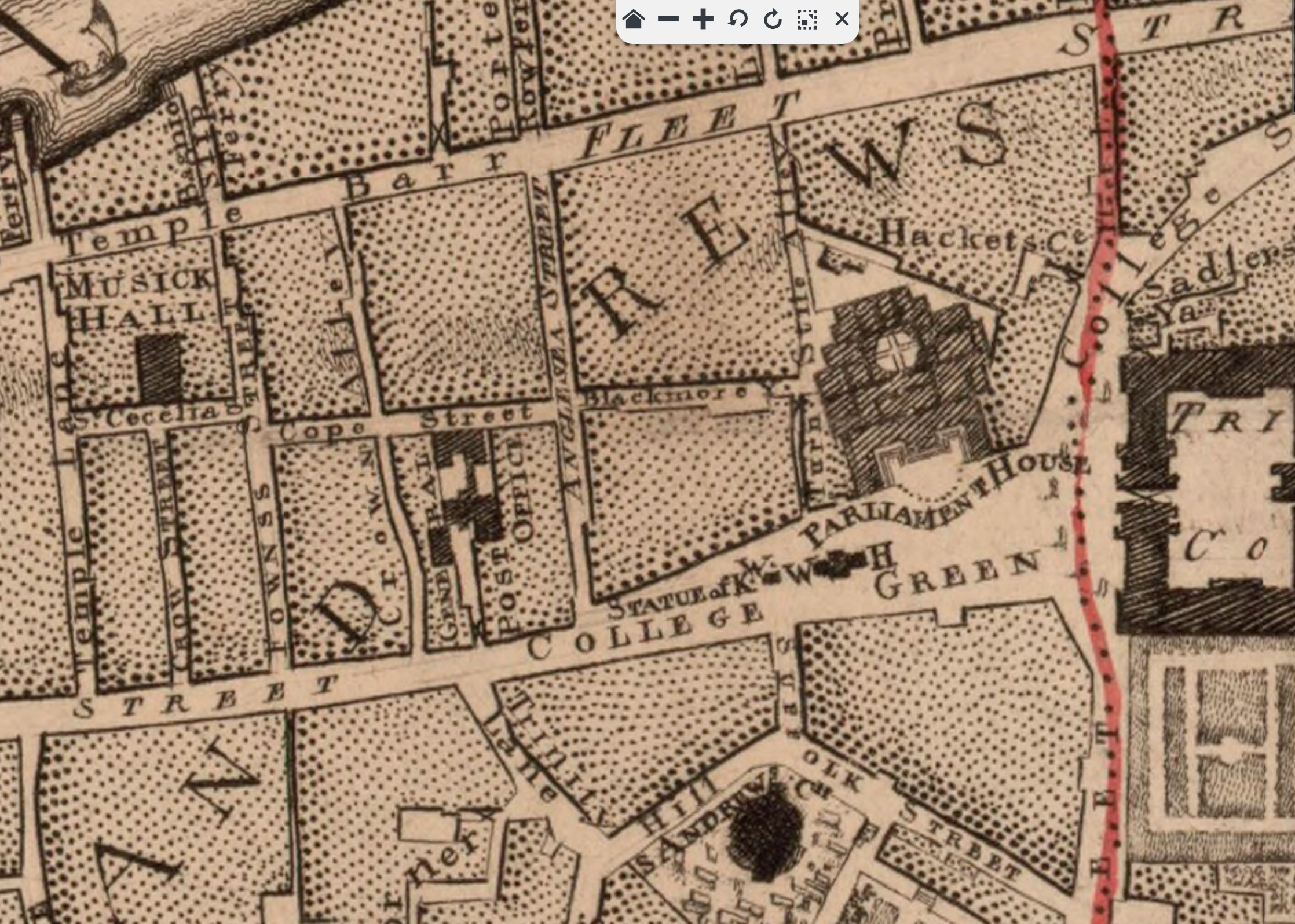
John Rocque's 1756 map of Dublin, Anglesea Street at centre.

The street is named for Arthur Annesley, 1st Earl of Anglesey (1614–1686), a notable Royalist whose estate was in the area. Anglesea Road in Donnybrook is named for the 5th Earl, while Anglesea Street, Cork, and Anglesea Street, Clonmel, were named for Henry Paget, 1st Marquess of Anglesey. It was developed in the mid-18th century and appears on John Rocque's 1756 map of Dublin.

Many of its Georgian buildings are architecturally and historically significant. Number 10 was extensively remodelled in 1898 in a Queen Anne Revival style by the stockbroker and philanthropist Laurence Ambrose ‘Larkey’ Waldron; his initials LAW appear on the facade, with blue details.

The luthier George Ward was based on Anglesea Street from 1760; later, Thomas Perry, John Mackintosh, John Delany, Richard Tobin, and William Ringwood also made instruments on the street.

The Irish Stock Exchange was based on Anglesea Street from 1878 until 2000 after moving from the nearby Commercial Buildings which could be entered via Cope Street and Dame Street.

The painters William Cuming and Edward Daniel Leahy worked on Anglesea Street in the early 19th century. The publisher and bookseller Bryan Geraghty was also there in the 19th century.

The Dublin Christian Mission was on Anglesea Street from 1879 to 1939.

Many solicitors' firms are based on Anglesea Street today; there are also many bars and restaurants. The James Joyce-themed hotel Bloom's opened in 1980, even though the street has no Joycean connections and is not mentioned in any of his works.

== Gallery ==
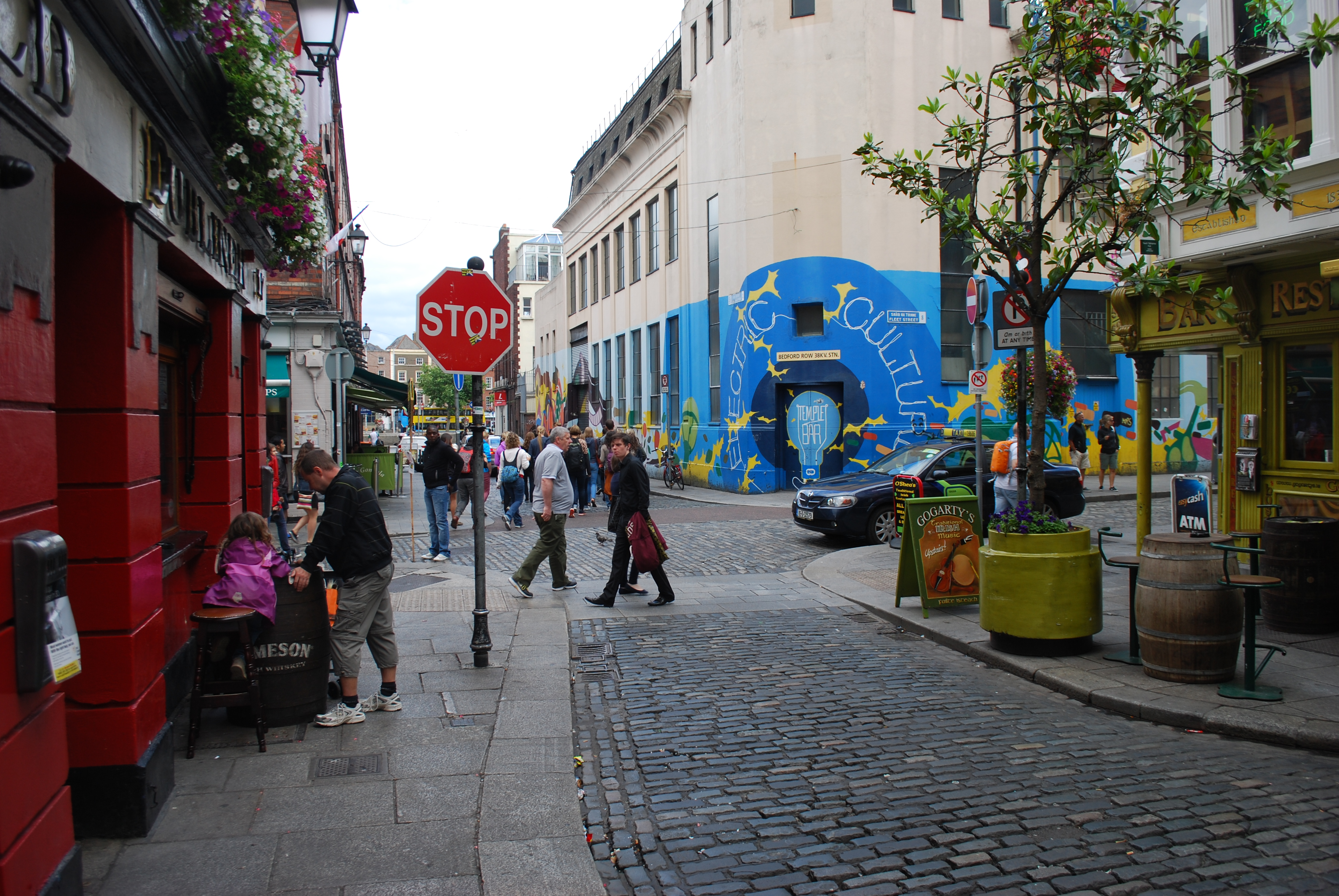
View from Anglesea St onto Fleet St

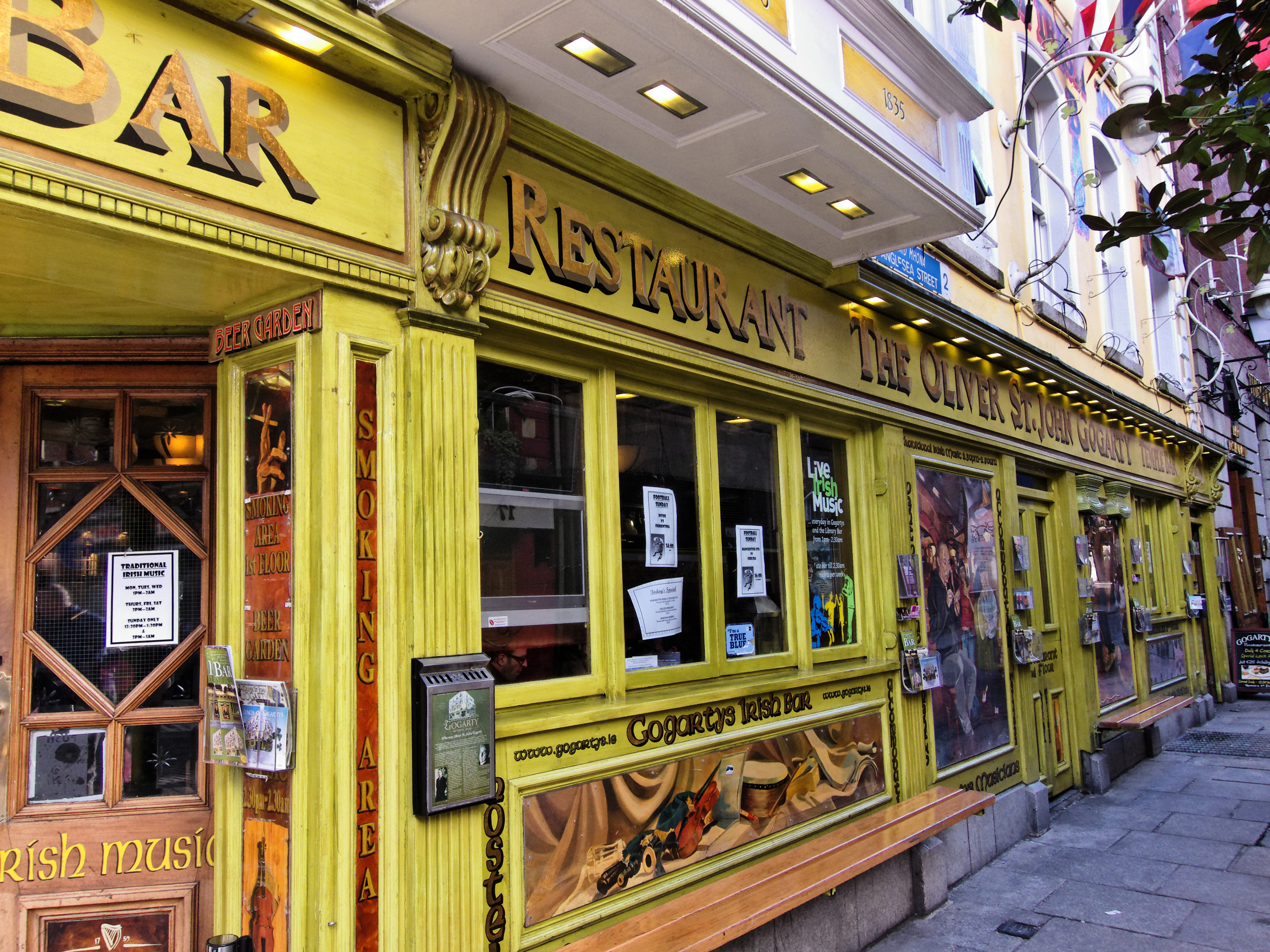
Oliver St. John Gogarty pub, facing onto Anglesea St

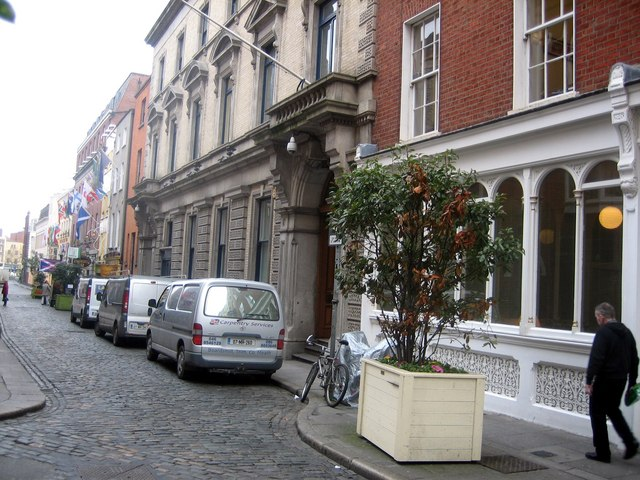
Irish Stock Exchange

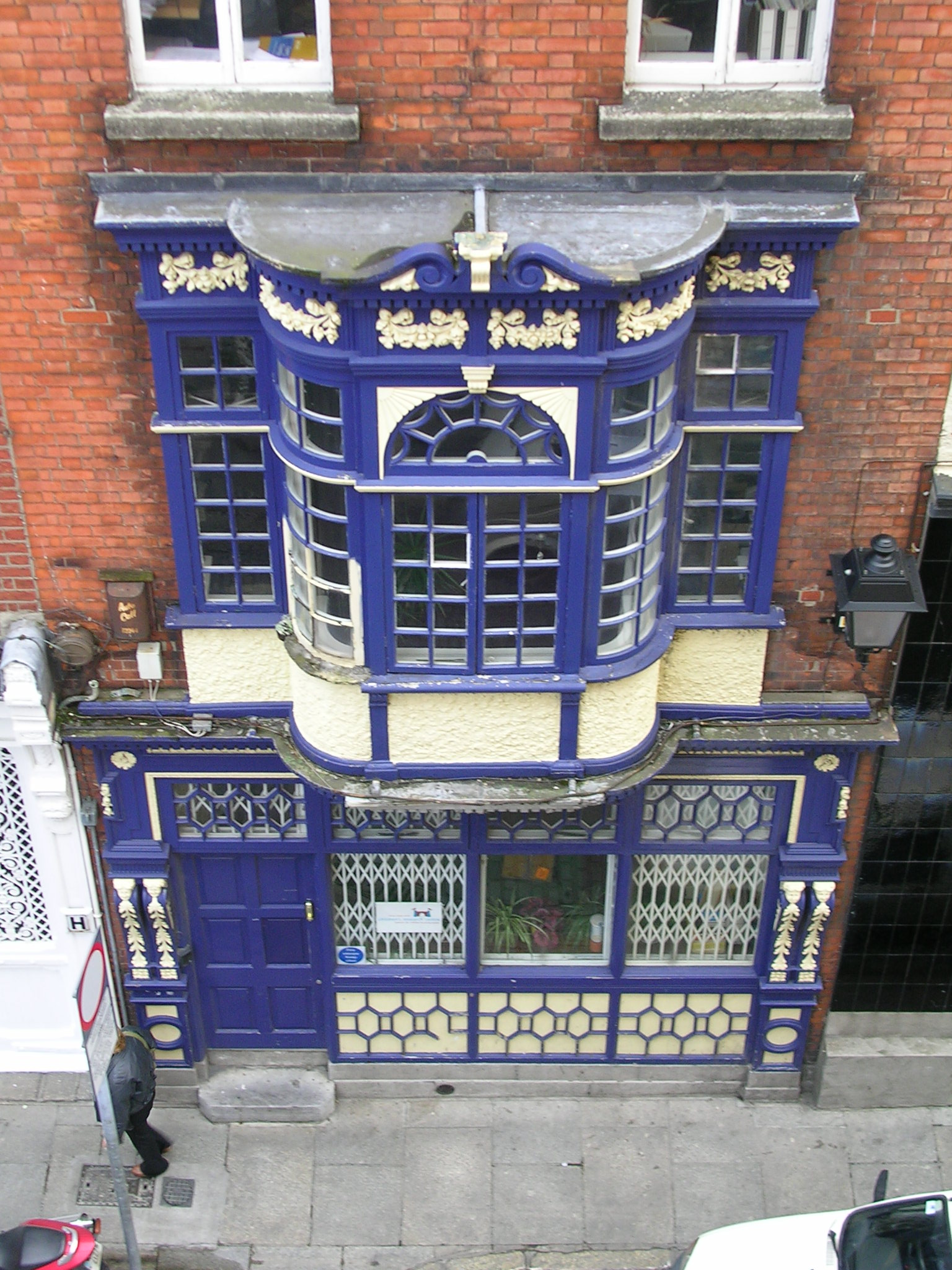
Number 10

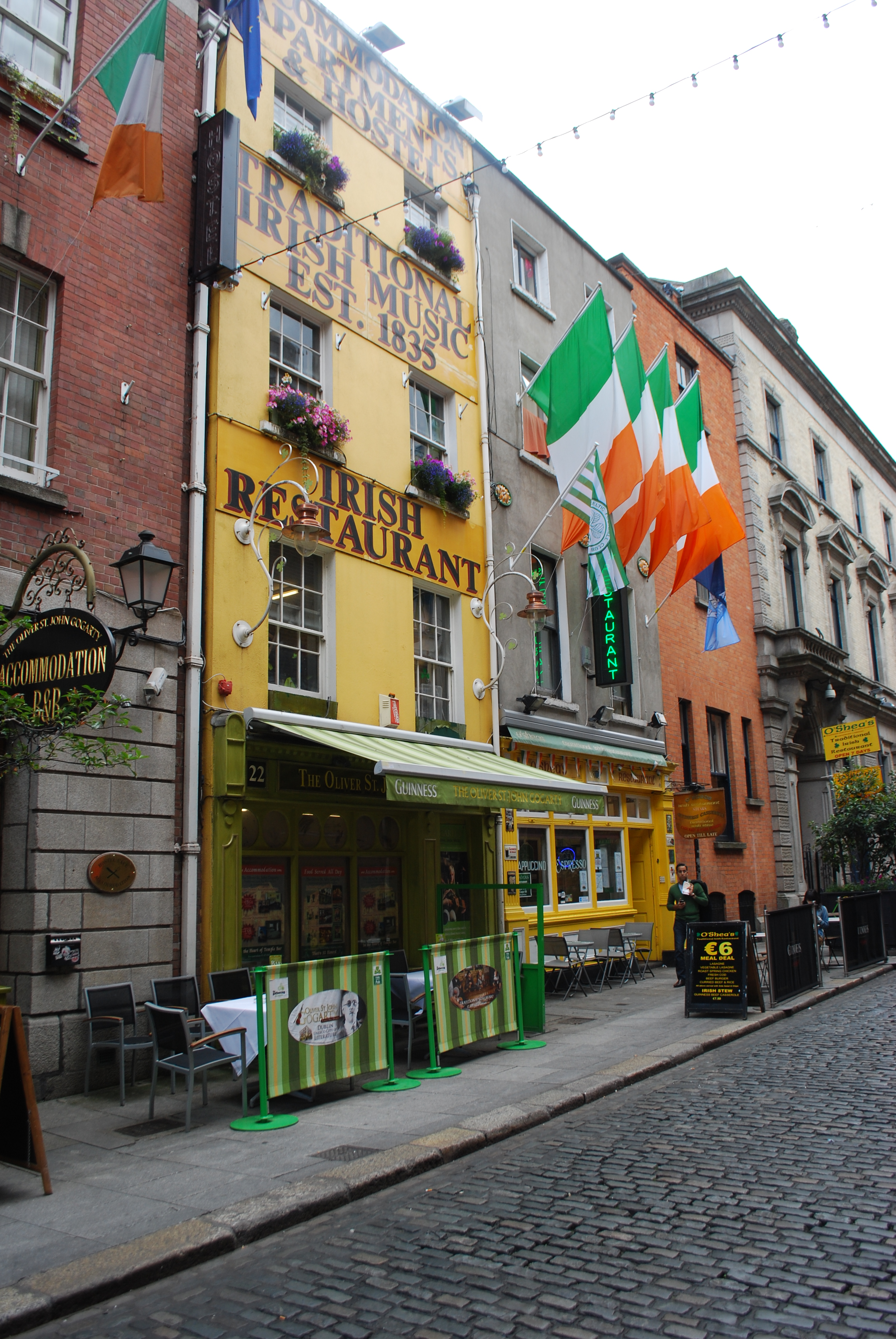
O'Shea's Irish Restaurant, 23 Anglesea Street

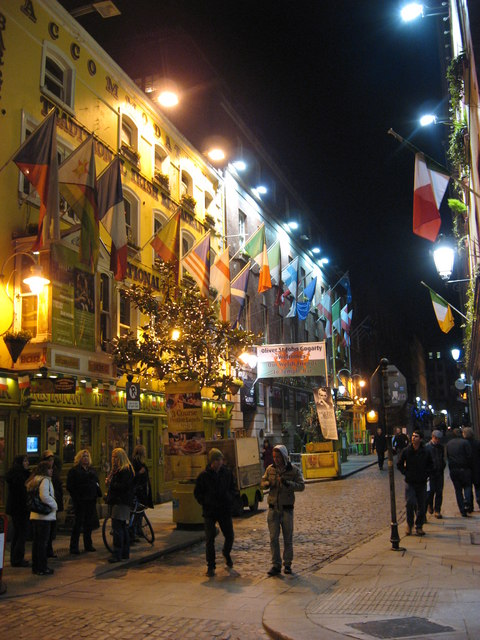
The street at night

== See also ==
- List of streets and squares in Dublin
