= George Ward (luthier) =

Irish luthier (c.1715–1769)

- Seoirse Mac an Bháird
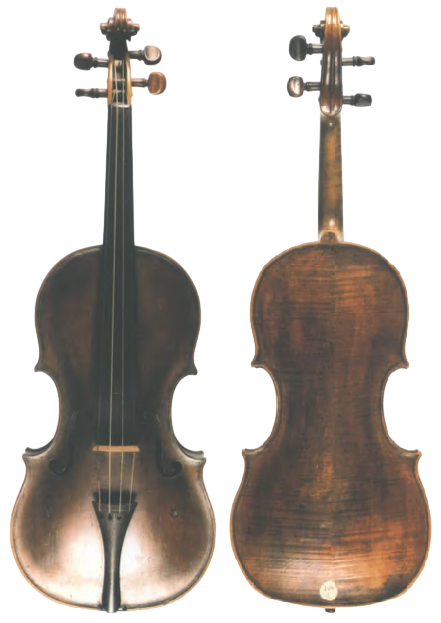
- Violin by Ward, c. 1750
- Born: c. 1715; Dublin, Ireland
- Died: c. 1769; Dublin, Ireland
- Known for: Luthier
- Notable work: violin, NMI & Chimei collections
- Style: Ward style; Stradivari style
- Movement: Irish school
- Parents: Samuel Ward (father); Mary Ward (mother)
- Relatives: John Ward (brother); Isabelle Ward (niece); William Gibson (nephew-in-law)

George Ward (Irish: Seoirse Mac an Bháird; c. 1715–1769) was an Irish luthier and maker of violins and cellos from Dublin. His instruments combine an original style with influences from the Stainer and Stradivari model. Two of his violins are housed in museum collections, one at the National Museum of Ireland, Dublin and the other at the Chimei Museum, Tainan, Taiwan.

== Early life ==
Very little is known about Ward's early life. It has been proposed that he was born in Dublin in 1715 to Samuel and Mary Ward, based on baptism records from the Church of St Nicholas Without, Dublin, 18 May 1715. He had a brother named John (1703–1778), whom there is also evidence of being baptized to the same parents and at the same church on 1 October 1704. John was also a violin maker based in Dublin. John's daughter, Isabelle, married Dublin guitar maker, William Gibson. Ward may have spent his childhood in Christchurch Yard in Dublin, where he is first recorded to have worked. Faulkner's Dublin Journal records the death of a Mr. Lewis Ward, Toyman, of Christchurch-yard on 5 October 1765, possibly a relation to George.

== Career ==
=== Apprenticeship and early career: 1729–1740 ===
It is uncertain who Ward apprenticed with as a violin maker, but it is possible that he was a pupil of Dublin luthier Thomas Molineux (d. 1757), who also resided at Christchurch Yard. Furthermore, Ward branded his instruments 'WARD/DUBLIN' at the back below the button, a trait which he may have adopted from Molineux. Based on his proposed year of birth, Ward likely began his apprenticeship around 1729. However, the dates that Ward was active as a luthier are debated amongst historians. William Henley believed him to be active as early as 1710, probably based on the earliest date attributed to one of his instruments, supposedly labelled 1719. However, it has been suggested that Henley may have misread the label. Others date the start of his career as late as 1750, from which period there are more extant instruments. However, there is evidence that Ward was working as a violin maker at Christchurch Yard by around 1740.

=== Perry connection and later career: 1740–1769 ===
Some time between 1740 and 1750, Ward moved to Lee's Lane, Aston Quay. It has been proposed that Ward may have taken on a young Thomas Perry as an apprentice around 1752 due to the similarity of Perry's early instruments. Perry also began his career as a luthier at Christchurch Yard and used to brand his instruments 'PERRY/DUBLIN' at the back below the button, a trait that he likely inherited from Ward. Perry would go on to become one of the most prolific Irish luthiers and later set up a thriving workshop where numerous Irish and international luthiers would learn their trade. Sometime around 1760, Ward moved his business to Anglesea Street. It is likely that he worked at this address with his brother, John, as there is an Irish harp that bears the brand 'John Ward / Anglesea Street / Dublin 1761'. Ward remained and worked at this address until his death in 1769. It has been suggested that Perry may have succeeded Ward at the same address in Anglesea Street, since he appears to have moved to this address about the same time as Ward's death, adding to the possibility that Perry was a former pupil of his.

== Style and technique ==
Ward's style of violin making is considered original, with influences of both the Stainer and Stradivari traditions. It is not known whether he inherited this distinctive style from his teacher or developed it himself over time. The link between Ward's style and Perry's earlier instruments suggests that Ward had a strong influence on Perry.

In terms of his workmanship, Ward has been described by Rev. Morris as an "artist" and by Henley as a "maker of undoubted ability". Ward's surviving instruments have been described by Henley as having "very handsome wood and beautiful varnish" and as being "quite superior" to those of Perry. As well as branding his instruments in the usual manner with his name and place, Ward also branded some of them with a crowned harp on the button.

The Irish violin-making school

Thomas Molineux c. 1700–1757
Patrick Harford fl. 1730–1752	Martyn Molineux c. 1720–?	John Perry I c. 1710–1787	George Ward c. 1715–1769	John Ward c. 1703–1778
Thomas Perry c. 1738–1818
James Perry c. 1759–1810	John Delany c. 1769–1838	William Ringwood c. 1769–1842	Richard Tobin c. 1766–1847	William Wilkinson c. 1767–1830	John Mackintosh c. 1780–1841
Daniel Compton ?–?	Arthur Ringwood c. 1812–1860	George Tobin c. 1809–1861

- solid lines = Pere-Fils
- dashed lines = Maitre-Eleve

== Extant instruments ==
It is not known how many instruments Ward produced in his lifetime. Some of them still survive today and occasionally come up for sale or auction, others are housed as part of collections and exhibits. One of Ward's finest violins was acquired by the National Museum of Ireland in 1891 and is preserved as part of a collection of musical instruments by Irish makers. The collection also includes instruments by Perry, Molineux, Delany and Mackintosh.

Some of Ward's extant instruments:

=== Violins ===
Year	Location	LOB	Notes
		35.5 cm	ascribed to George Ward, indistinctly labelled; sold by Christie's in July 1996 for £748 (Lot 64)
c. 1740	Aston's Quay, Dublin		labelled 'Made by George Ward in Lee's Lane on Aston's Quay, Dublin, 1740'; two-piece back of rather plain medium to narrow curled maple; branded on the button with a crowned harp; branded below the button ‘Ward, Dublin’; National Museum of Ireland collection
1747	Aston's Quay, Dublin	35.8 cm	labelled 'Made by George Ward in Aston's Quay, Dublin, 1747', Stainer model with full arching, inlaid purfling and one-piece back with brick-red varnish, Chimei Museum collection
c. 1750			branded 'WARD/DUBLIN', private collection
c. 1750			two-piece back of medium to narrow curl with table of medium grain and golden brown varnish, sold by Bonhams in July 1997 for £1,610 (Lot 170)
1751	Aston's Quay, Dublin		sold by Christie's in June 1990 for £825 (Lot 92)
1753	Aston's Quay, Dublin		formerly Graham collection
1758	Aston's Quay, Dublin		labelled 'Made by George Ward in Lee's Lane on Aston's Quay, Dublin, 1758'
1762	Anglesea Street, Dublin	35.8 cm	labelled 'Made by George Ward in Anglesea Street in 1762', Stainer model with full arching, delicate edgework, a one-piece back with a distinctive flame and original golden-brown varnish
1764	Anglesea Street, Dublin		labelled 'Made by George Ward in Anglesea Street in 1764'
1766	Anglesea Street, Dublin		labelled 'Made by George Ward in Anglesea Street 17 Dublin 66'
1768	Anglesea Street, Dublin		sold by Philip's in June 1992 for £990 (Lot 54)
c. 1770	Anglesea Street, Dublin		labelled 'Made by George Ward in Anglesey Street 17 Dublin 19' (may have been misread)

=== Cellos ===
Year	Location	LOB	Notes
c. 1753	Aston's Quay, Dublin		similar to the 1753 violin

== See also ==
- Thomas Molineux (Irish luthier)
- Thomas Perry (Irish luthier)
