= R. S. Williams & Sons =

Former musical instrument manufacturing company

R. S. Williams & Sons was musical instrument manufacturing company headquartered in Toronto, Ontario with a factory located in Oshawa, Ontario.

== History ==
The company was founded in Toronto in 1855 by Richard Sugden Williams. After completing his apprenticeship in 1853 with Toronto melodeon maker William Townsend, Williams continued to work for Townsend. After a move to Hamilton, Townsend's business failed in 1855; Williams took over the bankrupt company, and returned the business to Toronto. He started by making mandolins and banjos, and later melodeons and organs, at a store on Queen Street.

In 1873 Williams established The Canadian Organ & Piano Company to house his growing piano-manufacturing business, while maintaining a retail store on Yonge Street. In 1885 the company built a large factory on Hayter Street. By this time the company employed about 150 instrument builders, as well as ten travelling salesmen, and had opened a showroom in London, Ontario.

In 1888 Williams' son Robert took control of the Canadian Organ & Piano Company; it was moved to Oshawa, Ontario (then a small town) where it took over a large building previously used by the Joseph Hall Works. This arm of the company was renamed The R. S. Williams Piano Company of Oshawa.

In 1891 the factory building was damaged by fire, but repaired. In 1909 the name of the Oshawa factory was amended again to R. S. Williams & Sons, Ltd.

In 1912 the company donated a large collection of musical instruments to the newly opened Royal Ontario Museum. Robert Williams became president of the company after his father's death.

R. S. Williams & Sons ceased business in Toronto because of bankruptcy in 1927; the Oshawa factory closed down in 1931. The factory building was demolished in 1968.
