= Benjamin Banks (violin maker) =

English violin-maker (1750–1795)

Benjamin Banks (1727–1795) ranks among the finest English violin-makers of the eighteenth century.

== Life ==
Banks was originally apprenticed to his uncle William Hutoft. Banks seems to have occupied Hutoft's premises on Catherine Street in Salisbury upon Hutoft's demise in 1747 until Banks' own in 1795. From 1757 until the late 1760s, Banks was primarily interested in the construction of keyboard instruments. He had a close association with Longman and Broderip in London, who seemed to have been an outlet for his violins (these examples are stamped with the Longman name). The instruments were based on the Amati and Stainer form, the cellos being particularly sought after. Such instruments were often branded 'Banks' - externally and on the inner linings.

Banks's business was carried on after his death by his two sons, James and Henry, who subsequently moved to Liverpool.
