= Panormo family =

Family of Italian luthiers and violin makers

Panormo is the name of an important Italian family of violin makers, resident originally in Palermo, later in Naples, Paris, Dublin and, for years, in London. Described as "amongst the most celebrated violin makers to ever have worked in London", they are famous for introducing the Stradivari style of violin-making to England. The family name was originally Trusiano, but the additional appellation “Panormo”, meaning “of Palermo”, was adopted in the 18th and 19th centuries. The earliest recorded member of the Panormo family was Gaspare Trusiano Panormo, whose label is found in an early 18th-century double bass.

Vincenzo Trusiano Panormo (1734–1813) was born in Monreale, near Palermo. The family moved to Naples in 1759, and Vincenzo is thought to have studied violin making in Naples with the celebrated Gagliano family of luthiers resident there. From around 1770 to 1789, Panormo worked in Paris as a violin maker. At the start of the French Revolution, he moved for several years to Dublin, where he worked with Thomas Perry, and then to London where he crafted instruments until his death in 1813.

Historians note Panormo, although his training was largely in Italy and France, as one of the finest English violin makers. His violins show strong influences of Stradivarius and Amati. Many of the traditional accounts of Panormo's life say that he spent some time working in Cremona for the Bergonzi family. Although no documentary evidence has been found, there is a strong stylistic link between them. The influence of this great master on the London makers of the time, and those that followed, is enormous. Panormo was responsible for introducing the Cremonese style into London. He was also the father of Joseph and George Panormo, important luthiers in their own right, as well as the guitar maker Louis Panormo.

Joseph Panormo (1768-1837), the second son of Vincenzo Panormo, trained in his father’s shop, where he worked until he opened his own shop in around 1801. Maintaining his father’s style and careful attention to detail, he continued to follow the Stradivari model. He rarely signed his work, but several violins currently accepted as Vincenzo's work have been found to be monogrammed ‘JP’ on the interior. He continued to make violins, violas, and cellos of very high quality until at least 1830.

George Panormo (1776-1852), born in Paris, was the third son of Vincenzo Panormo. Trained by Vincenzo, he largely worked alongside his father in their shop until Vincenzo's death in 1813, and is thought to have assisted in making many instruments attributed to Vincenzo, though his signed work is rare. His style is similar to Vincenzo's late work and his instruments are often hard to distinguish from those of his father. His workmanship is of high quality: his finest work, often ascribed to the period 1802-1808, is described as "elegant" and "gloriously built".
