= Georgy Rimsky-Korsakov =

Soviet composer, music theorist and acoustician (1901–1965)

- Георгий Михайлович Римский-Корсаков
- Born: 26 December 1901; Saint Petersburg, Russian Empire
- Died: 10 September 1965 (aged 63); Leningrad, Russian SFSR, Soviet Union
- Education: Leningrad Conservatory
- Occupations: Composer, music theorist, acoustician, teacher
- Known for: Quarter-tone music, musical acoustics
- Relatives: Nikolai Rimsky-Korsakov (grandfather)

Georgy Mikhailovich Rimsky-Korsakov (Георгий Михайлович Римский-Корсаков; 26 December 1901 – 10 September 1965) was a Soviet composer, music theorist, acoustician and teacher, and a grandson of Nikolai Rimsky-Korsakov. He is best known for his part in the quarter-tone experiments of the 1920s. In 1923 he founded the Circle of Quarter-Tone Music at the Petrograd Conservatory and went on to develop his own system of quarter-tone composition. He later worked in acoustics and film sound, and helped build the Variophone with Evgeny Sholpo. Most of his compositions are not microtonal. They include orchestral and chamber works, piano pieces, music for theatre and film, and about 150 romances.

== Early life and education ==
Rimsky-Korsakov was born in Saint Petersburg. His father, the zoologist Mikhail Nikolayevich Rimsky-Korsakov, was a son of the composer. Georgy studied composition with Maximilian Steinberg and graduated from the Leningrad Conservatory in 1926. In 1929 he completed postgraduate studies in music theory and acoustics at the Leningrad Institute of Theatre and Music under Boris Asafyev and A. V. Finagin.

== Quarter-tone music ==
Rimsky-Korsakov founded the Circle of Quarter-Tone Music in 1923, while still a student, and it soon became one of the main centres of microtonal music in Soviet Russia. Most of the Circle's performers were conservatory students. Rimsky-Korsakov, Dmitri Shostakovich and Sofia Chicherina played piano, while others played harmonium and orchestral instruments. Regular public concerts began in 1925, with programmes that included works by Soviet composers and Western European microtonalists.

Rimsky-Korsakov corresponded with Alois Hába, Ivan Wyschnegradsky, Julián Carrillo and Jörg Mager. Through this correspondence, scores and writings from abroad reached Leningrad, and some of these works were performed at the Circle's concerts.

In his article "The Basis of the Quarter-Tone Musical System" (1925), Rimsky-Korsakov described a system of notation and a method of organizing modes and harmony. He retained major–minor tonality, applying it to the quarter-tone scale. His quarter-tone works called for two pianos tuned a quarter tone apart, harmonium and other specially adapted instruments. In 1927 he gave a public demonstration of quarter-tone music in Moscow.

Most of his microtonal works have not survived. His archive for this period was destroyed during the Second World War, and research on the Circle depends largely on letters and documents held in other archives. Studies of Rimsky-Korsakov have focused mainly on the Soviet avant-garde and the history of microtonal music.

== Acoustics and film sound ==
In the late 1920s Rimsky-Korsakov turned increasingly to acoustics and sound technology. With the introduction of sound film, he worked in laboratories and studios at Lenfilm and Tekhfilm. From 1929 to 1932 he worked as a sound engineer at Lenfilm. He held research positions at the Leningrad Institute of Theatre and Music in 1929–1932 and 1942–1946.

With Evgeny Sholpo he worked on the Variophone, an early optical synthesizer, and took part in building its first model at Lenfilm in 1931. The instrument produced sound from patterns drawn and photographed onto film, allowing pitch and timbre to be set without a performer. Rimsky-Korsakov used it for experimental sound pieces, including The Carburettor Suite.

== Compositions ==
His works include a symphony (1925), two string quartets, a quintet for violin, viola, cello, clarinet and horn, and an octet. He also composed two piano sonatas, 24 preludes, studies and other piano pieces, as well as music for theatre and film.

He wrote about 150 romances to texts by Pushkin, Lermontov, Fet and others. He set poems by Alexander Blok more often than those of any other poet, writing songs to his texts between 1921 and 1955.

His quarter-tone works date from 1925 to 1932. Most of his songs and chamber music are tonal and written for conventional instruments.

== Teaching and later work ==
Rimsky-Korsakov taught musical acoustics and instrumentation at the Leningrad Conservatory from 1927 to 1962 and became an associate professor in 1928. During the war he also taught theory at a music school in Tomsk. In 1944 he was one of the founders of the Rimsky-Korsakov House Museum in Tikhvin.

He wrote on quarter-tone theory, acoustics and orchestration. His writings include studies of combination tones and modal acoustics, an analysis of the colour-light part in Scriabin's Prometheus, and the book Orchestral Polyphony (1955).

== Selected works ==
=== Orchestral and chamber ===
- Symphony (1925)
- Quintet for violin, viola, cello, clarinet and horn (1925)
- String Quartet No. 1 (1925)
- String Quartet No. 2 (1932)
- Octet for two emiritons, two clarinets, bassoon, violin, viola and cello (1932)
- Quarter-tone chamber works for specially tuned instruments (1925–1932)

=== Piano ===
- Two piano sonatas
- 24 preludes
- Studies and other pieces

=== Vocal ===
- Mutiny, for chorus and orchestra, after Émile Verhaeren (1927)
- Three Keys, for three voices and piano, after Pushkin
- Three Knights, for three voices and piano, after Lermontov (1936)
- Romances on texts by Pushkin, Lermontov, Fet, Blok and other poets

== Selected writings ==
- "Обоснование четвертитоновой музыкальной системы" ("The Basis of the Quarter-Tone Musical System", 1925)
- "Расшифровка световой строки скрябинского «Прометея»" ("Deciphering the Light Line in Scriabin's Prometheus", 1926)
- "О высоте комбинационных тонов" ("On the Pitch of Combination Tones", 1927)
- "Акустическое обоснование теории ладового ритма" ("Acoustical Basis of the Theory of Modal Rhythm", 1928)
- Оркестровая полифония (Orchestral Polyphony, 1955)
