= Carlo Bergonzi =

Carlo Bergonzi may refer to:

- Carlo Bergonzi (luthier) (1683–1747), Italian luthier
- Carlo Bergonzi (tenor) (1924–2014), Italian operatic tenor
