= Stefan-Peter Greiner =

German luthier (born 1966)

Stefan-Peter Greiner (born 1966 in Stuttgart) is a German luthier residing in Zurich. He primarily builds violins.

== Career ==
Greiner built his first violin at the age of fourteen. He completed his training in Bonn.

In 2013, he moved his workshop from Bonn to London, where he worked with several renowned experts and auction houses. Since 2018, Greiner has been managing the violin-making company W. E. Hill & Sons, London, together with Robert Brewer Young.

His goal was to build instruments that sounded close to a singing voice, with focus on the range from 2000 to 4000 Hz. During a longstanding partnership with Remagen physicist Heinrich Dünnwald, who had acoustically analyzed over 1300 violins, Greiner felt that he had succeeded in coming close to the sound of centuries-old Guarneri and Stradivari instruments.

Some of his more notable customers included Leonidas Kavakos, Kim Kashkashian, Bruno Monsaingeon, Frédéric Pelassy, Christian Tetzlaff, the Keller Quartet, and members of the Hagen Quartet and the Alban Berg Quartet. He received the 2003 Rheingau Musik Preis, an award initiated in 1994 by the Rheingau Music Festival. Over 100 CDs featuring his instruments have been released.

Greiner currently resides in Zurich, Switzerland.

== Publications ==
- Stefan-Peter Greiner and Florian Leonhard: Jean-Baptiste Vuillaume, Bocholt 1998; ISBN 3-00-002088-8
- Brigitte Brandmair and Stefan-Peter Greiner: Stradivari Varnish - Scientific Analysis of his Finishing Technique on Selected Instruments, 2009 ISBN 3-00-028537-7
