= Ivan Wyschnegradsky =

Russian composer

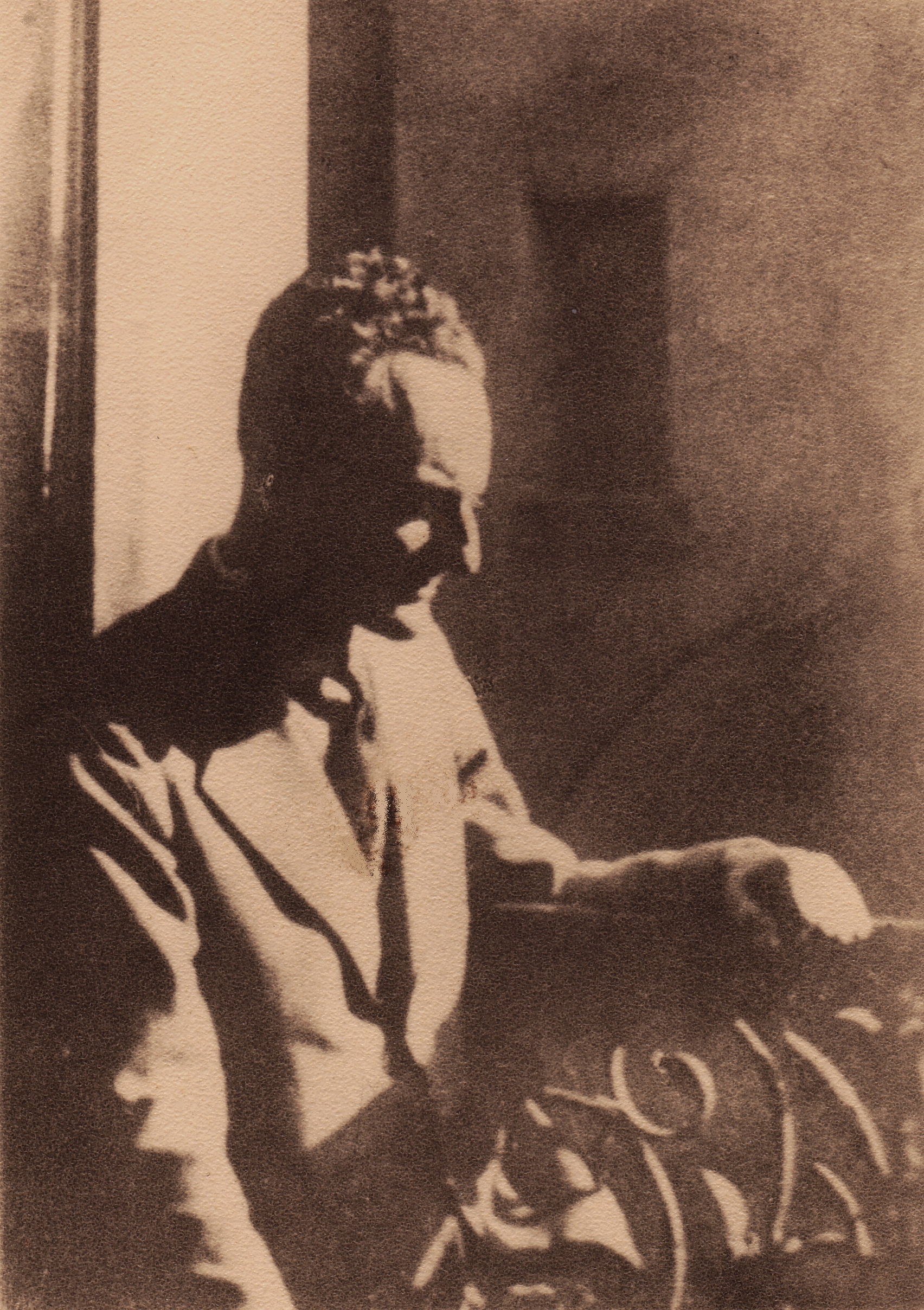
- Wyschnegradsky in Paris, c. 1930
- Born: Ива́н Алекса́ндрович Вышнегра́дский; 14 May [O.S. 2 May] 1893; Saint Petersburg
- Died: September 29, 1979 (aged 86); Paris
- Occupations: Composer, Music theorist
- Era: 20th century
- Known for: Microtonality
- Spouse(s): Hélène Benois (m. 1924, d. 1926); Lucile Markov (Gayden)
- Children: Jacques Demêtre (née Dimitri)
- Parent: Alexander & Sophie Wyschnegradsky
- Website: ivan-wyschnegradsky.fr

Ivan Alexandrovich Wyschnegradsky (Note: Russian: Ива́н Алекса́ндрович Вышнегра́дский, transliterated as Vïshnegradsky, Wyschnegradsky, Wischnegradsky, Vishnegradsky, and Wishnegradsky. The composer's preferred transliteration was "Wyschnegradsky".) (US: /vɪʃnəˈɡrɑːdski/ vish-ne-GROD-skee; Russian: Ива́н Алекса́ндрович Вышнегра́дский; 14 May [O.S. 2 May] 1893 – September 29, 1979), was a Russian composer primarily known for his microtonal compositions. For most of his life, from 1920 onwards, Wyschnegradsky lived in Paris.

== Life ==
Ivan Wyschnegradsky was born in Saint Petersburg on May 4, 1893. His father, Alexander, was a banker, and his mother, Sophie, wrote poems. His grandfather Ivan was a celebrated mathematician who served as the Minister for Finance from 1888 to 1892. After his baccalaureate, Wyschnegradsky entered the School of Mathematics. He studied harmony, composition, and orchestration with Nicolas Sokolov at the Saint Petersburg Conservatory. In 1912, he entered the School of Law.

In November 1916, Wyschnegradsky had a spiritual vision. It inspired the composition of La Journée de l’Existence for narrator with orchestra and chorus. He worked on it for several decades, and it would not be performed until 1978. Most of his later work germinated from this singular experience. He completed his law studies the day before the revolution in 1917. His father died that November.

Wyschnegradsky moved to Paris in 1920. Three years later, he married Hélène Benois, the daughter of Alexandre Benois. It was her second marriage. Their son Dimitri was born in 1924. He grew up to become an influential blues historian using the pen name Jacques Demêtre. Wyschnegradsky and Benois divorced in 1926. His second wife was Lucile Markov (Gayden).

In 1942, Wyschnegradsky was arrested by the Germans and transferred to Royallieu-Compiègne internment camp, where he remained for two months. As an American, Lucile was interned at Vittel. After the war, he contracted tuberculosis and lived at the sanatorium of St. Martin-du-Tertre from 1947–50.

Lucile died in 1970. Wyschnegradsky's senescence in his Paris apartment is often described as impoverished and austere. Paul Auster fictionalized his friendship with the composer in his 1986 novel The Locked Room. In the novel, Wyschnegradsky is mentioned by name and given a refrigerator by his much younger friend.

Wyschnegradsky died at the age of 86 in Paris on September 29, 1979.

== Music career ==
Wyschnegradsky's first performed work was Andante religioso and funèbre in 1912. César Cui attended the concert and congratulated Wyschnegradsky "for his moderation". He was enthusiastic about the Russian Revolution and set Vasily Knyazev's The Red Gospel to music.

Wyschnegradsky was deeply influenced by Alexander Scriabin's mysticism and approach to tonality. Though he did not attend Mikhail Matyushin's Futurist opera Victory over the Sun in 1913, the brief use of quarter-tones in the score had a profound effect on his artistic development. In 1919, Wyschnegradsky provided incidental music for a production of Macbeth at the Bolshoi Drama Theater.

Wyschnegradsky soon became convinced that equal temperament was inadequate for his work and began writing in microtones. All of the composer's early microtonal work was executed on two pianos tuned a quarter-tone apart. A primary motivation for his emigration in 1920 was the desire to develop instruments capable of playing microtones. He had every intention of returning to the Soviet Union, but it had changed too much by the time he was ready a few years later.

Wyschnegrasky designed a quarter-tone keyboard with three manuals. The quarter tone scale (24-tet: 50 cents) is the most frequent microtonality in his work. Wyschnegradsky also wrote one piece for Julián Carrillo's third-tone piano (18-tet: 66.6̅ cents). In pursuit of what he called "ultrachromaticisim", Wyschnegradsky composed in even smaller divisions of the octave such as sixth tones (36-tet: 33.3̅ cents) and twelfth tones (72-tet: 16.6̅ cents).

Gustave Lyon at Pleyel was sympathetic to Wyschnegradsky's ambitions. The firm manufactured a quarter-tone piano for him in 1921 that relied on the pneumatic Pleyela system in their player pianos. The instrument produced inconsistent tone, making it undesirable for the composer. However, he did make extended use of punching piano rolls to develop the sophistication of his music. There was more quarter-tone interest in Berlin where he went to work with Richard Stein, Alois Hába, Jörg Mager, and Willy von Möllendorff.

In Braunschweig, Hába and Möllendorff were advising Grotrian-Steinweg on a quarter-tone piano. There were many disagreements about the layout for the keyboard. Möllendorf had designed a Straube harmonium with smaller keys for microtones. Wyschnegradsky found it effective enough to purchase one, but he knew keyboards like Möllendorf's and Paul von Jankó's did not afford enough kinetic potential to performers.

Grotrian-Steinweg built a prototype and marketed it in the spring of 1924. The instrument is lost, but the firm still has a portion of the keyboard mechanism in their archive. Hába realized the project with August Förster in 1928 using a keyboard based on Wyschnegradsky's design.

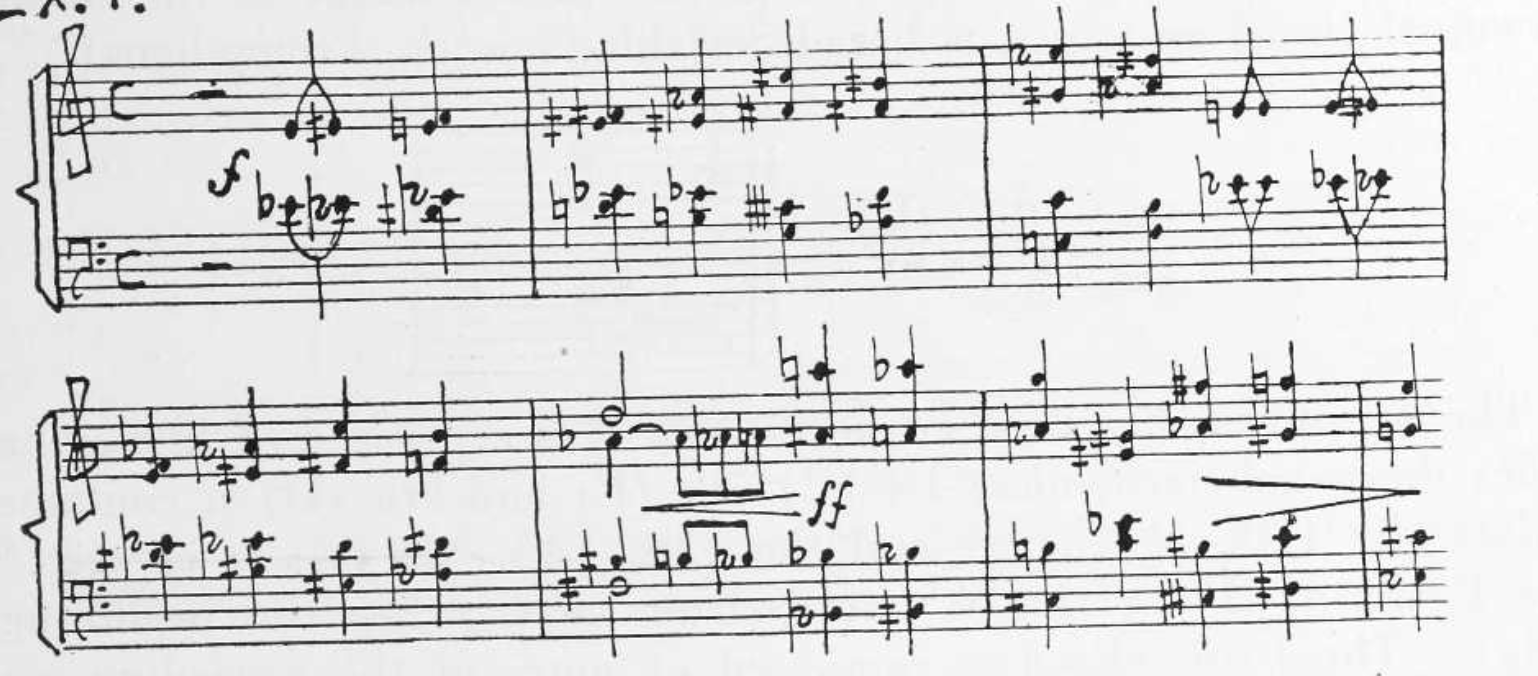
Excerpt from Prelude and Fugue, op. 15 (1927)

In 1929, one of the Förster upright quarter-tone pianos was delivered to Wyschnegradsky's apartment in Paris where he composed on it for the rest of his life. Even with a suitable quarter-tone instrument, Wyschnegradsky still found performing his music more feasible with separately tuned piano ensembles. Hába disapproved of the technique, preferring quarter-tone music to be performed on quarter-tone instruments. Wyschnegradsky reminded Hába that he designed the quarter-tone keyboard and that when two pianos of the same make are tuned correctly they sound like one instrument.

Though living in Paris, Wyschnegradsky's microtonal work was influential in Russia during the twenties. He maintained a correspondence with Georgy Rimsky-Korsakov (Nikolai's grandson) who organized performances of his work on programs of microtonal music by young Soviet composers. Dmitri Shostakovich often performed on these concerts.

In 1932, he published a 24-page brochure about quarter-tones. In 1934, he composed Twenty-four Preludes in All the Tones of the Chromatic Scale Diatonicized with Thirteen Sounds, for two pianos in quarter tones.

As early as November 1918, Wyschnegradsky had begun working on Ainsi parlait Zarathoustra based on Friedrich Nietzsche's sketch for the novel. His original ensemble was a standard orchestra with quarter-tone clarinet, harmonium, and piano. Its finished form was for four pianos, 2 tuned to 435 Hertz and 2 tuned a quarter-tone higher. It was premiered along with several of his other works at the Salle Pleyel on January 25, 1937. The concert was a success and led to friendships with fellow composers Olivier Messiaen, Henri Dutilleux, and Claude Ballif. In October 1938, Wyschnegradsky directed the recording of the third movement of Zarathoustra.

After the war, Wyschnegradsky organized another concert of his work at the Salle Pleyel on November 11, 1945. The performers included several of Messiaen's students such as Yvonne Loriod, Pierre Boulez, and Serge Nigg. In 1951, Pierre Boulez, Yvette Grimaud, Claude Helffer, and Ina Marika gave a performance of the composer's Second Symphonic Fragment in Paris. The Revue Musicale published a special issue on Ivan Wyschnegradsky and Nicolas Obouhow in 1972.

1977 saw special concerts of Wyschnegradsky's music organized at Radio France by Martine Joste and in Canada by Bruce Mather. The composer also improvised on piano for one of Margaret Fisher's performances in Paris that year. In 1978, Alexandre Myrat conducted the premiere of La Journée de l’Existence with the Orchestre philharmonique de Radio France. Ivan Wyschnegradsky was invited to the DAAD Artists-in-Berlin Program. He could not go due to ill health. His last commission was from Radio France for a string trio. He died before he could complete it.

== Theories ==
Throughout his career, Wyschnegradsky wrote theoretical articles in a variety of languages. He worked on a microtonality treatise for decades. Titled La Loi de la Pansonorité (The Law of Pansonority), it was not published in his lifetime.

"Pansonority" was Wyschnegradsky's way of articulating the mystical experience he had in 1916. He realized that music represented a separation of sounds out of a continuous fabric that exists in the universe. Of this pansonority, Wyschnegradsky wrote in 1927:

"...isolated sounds do not exist...the entire musical space is filled with living sonorous matter.

This state, absolutely incomprehensible to human reason, may be clearly felt, and sentiment can perceive or "hear" this sonority through a manner of inner intuition.

But musical art operates through detached sounds, and because of this it is artificial and anti-continuous. Hence the primordial tragedy of music: the impossibility of attaining its ideal: Pan-sonority. And yet, in spite of this, the entire history of musical art is nothing but an attempt to reach the ideal.

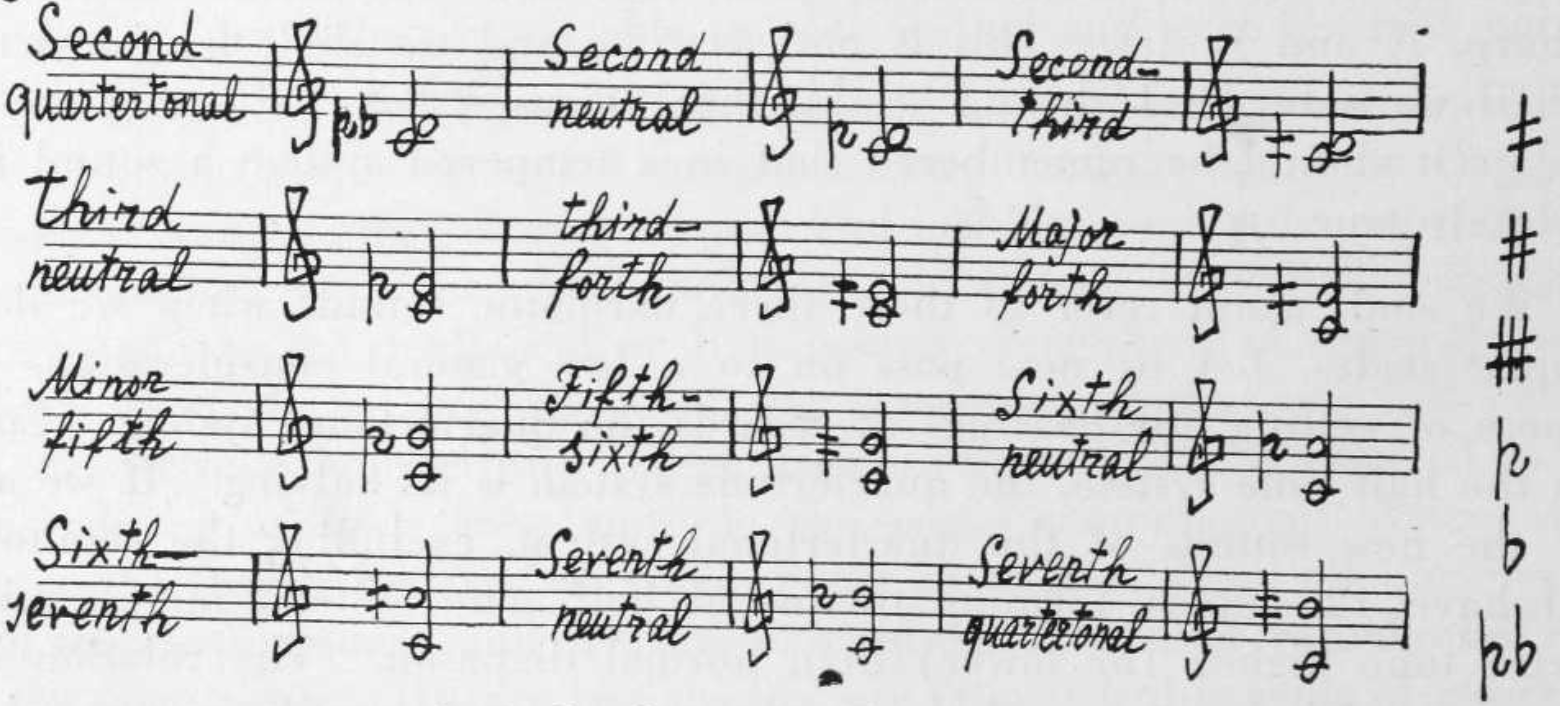
Ivan Wyschnegradsky's microtonal intervals

As evidence for pansonority, Wyschnegradsky would point to the inaccurate assignment of note names to overtones. Partials like the 11th, 13th, and 14th are raised by an entire quarter-tone to fit into equal temperament. Since these quarter-tones are naturally occurring in the harmonic series, Wyschnegradsky posits that microintervals are organic and provide a richer tone world.

In 1932, Wyschnegradsky published a brief but methodical brochure on microtonality, advancing the field beyond what had been written to date by composers like Charles Ives and Alois Hába. Manuel d’harmonie á quarts de ton (Manual of Quarter-Tone Harmony) systematizes microintervals, albeit with idiosyncratic names. For instance, a major third that has been lowered by a quarter-tone is called "neutral" because it is neither major nor minor. A perfect fourth that has been raised by a quarter-tone is called "major".

Part of Wyschnegradsky's mystical vision of pantonality corresponded to the color spectrum. As he aged, he spent more of his energy on producing chromatic drawings that resemble mandalas. The 12 pitches of the chromatic scale are assigned different colors and the microtones are related shades. Like Scriabin, Wyschnegradsky wanted to combine color and sound, and he envisioned the chromatic drawings as projections on a dome above the audience.

== Works ==
- ‣Third-tones
- ○Quarter-tones
- +31-tones
- †Sixth-tones
- ‡Twelfth-tones
- §Mixed microtones

Orchestral

- La Journée de l'existence, for recitation, orchestra & choir ad. lib. (1916–1917, revised 1927 & 1939)
- Variations sans thème et conclusion (5), for orchestra, Op. 33 (1951–1952)○
- Polyphonies spatiales, for piano, harmonium, Onde Martenot, percussions & string orchestra, Op. 39 (1956)○
- L'Éternel Étranger, for voices, mixed choir, 4 pianos in quarter tones, percussions and orchestra (unfinished orchestration), Op. 50 (1940–1960)○
- Symphonie en un mouvement, for orchestra, Op. 51b (1969)○

Vocal

- L'automne (words by F. Nietzsche, translated to Russian), for bass-baritone & piano, Op. 1 (1917) Ed. Belaieff.
- Le soleil décline (words by F. Nietzsche), for bass-baritone & piano, Op. 3 (1917–1918) Ed. Belaieff.
- Le scintillement des étoiles (words by Sophie Wyschnegradsky), for soprano & piano, Op. 4 (1918)
- L'Évangile Rouge (words by Vassili Kniaseff), cycle for voice & piano (1st version), Op. 8 (1918–1920)
- L'Évangile Rouge, cycle for voice & 2 pianos in quarter tones (2nd version), Op. 8 (1918–1920)○
- Chants sur Nietzsche (2), for baritone & 2 pianos in quarter tones, Op. 9 (1923)○
- À Richard Wagner, for baritone & 2 pianos in quarter tones, Op. 26 (1934)○
- Chants russes (2), for bass-baritone & 2 pianos in quarter tones, Op. 29 (1940–1941)○
- Le mot, for soprano & piano, Op. 36 (1953)

Keyboard

- Préludes (2), for piano, Op. 2 (1916) Ed. Belaieff.
- Quatre fragments, for piano (1st version), Op. 5 (1918)
- Prélude et fugue sur un chant de l'Évangile rouge, for quartertone piano, version for string quartet (lost), Op. 15 (1927)○
- Prélude, for piano, Op. 38a (1956)
- Étude sur le carré magique sonore, for piano, Op. 40 (1956) Ed. Belaieff.
- Étude ultrachromatique, for Fokker 31-tone organ, Op. 42 (1959)+
- Prélude et danse, for Carrillo third tones piano, Op. 48 (1966)‣
- Deux piéces, for Carrillo twelfth tones piano, Op. 44b (1958)‡
- Trauergesang, Epigrammen, Ein Stück, for quartertone piano, without Op. (undated, found by M. Smolka in Alois Hába's archives in 1992)○

Chamber

- Chant douloureux et étude, for violin & piano, Op. 6 (1918)§
- Quatre fragments, for 2 pianos in quarter tones (2nd version), Op. 5 (1918)○
- Méditation sur deux thèmes de la Journée de l'existence, for cello & piano, Op. 7 (1918–1919)§
- Variations sur la note Do, for 2 pianos in quarter tones, Op. 10 (1918–1920)○
- Dithyrambe, for 2 pianos in quarter tones, Op. 12 (1923–1924, revised vers. by Bruce Mather, 1991)○
- String Quartet #1, Op. 13 (1923–1924)○
- Prélude et danse, for 2 pianos in quarter tones, Op. 16 (1926)○
- Chant nocturne, for violin & 2 pianos in quarter tones, Op. 11 (1927, revised 1971)§
- Ainsi parlait Zarathoustra, symphonie, for 4 pianos in quarter tones (sketches for orchestration in Bibliothèque Nationale, Paris), Op. 17 (1929–1930, revised 1936, Ed. L'Oiseau-Lyre)○
- String Quartet #2, Op. 18 (1930–1931)○
- Études de concert(2), for 2 pianos in quarter tones, Op. 19 (1931)○
- Étude en forme de scherzo, for 2 pianos in quarter tones, Op. 20 (1931)○
- Prélude et fugue, for 2 pianos in quarter tones, Op. 21 (1932)○
- Pièces (2), for 2 pianos in quarter tones, without Op. (1934)○
- Préludes dans tous les tons de l'échelle chromatique diatonisée à 13 sons (24), for 2 pianos in quarter tones, Op. 22 (1934, rev. 1960) Ed. Belaieff.○
- Premier fragment symphonique, for 4 pianos in quarter tones, Op. 23a; for orchestra, Op. 23c (1934, orch. vers. 1967)○
- Deuxième fragment symphonique, for 4 pianos in quarter tones, timpani & percussions, Op. 24 (1937)○
- Poème, for 2 pianos in quarter tones, without Op. (1937)○
- Cosmos, for 4 pianos in quarter tones, Op. 28 (1939–1940) Ed. Belaieff.○
- String Quartet #3, Op. 38b (1945–1958)
- Prélude et fugue, for 3 pianos in sixth tones, Op. 30 (1945)†
- Troisième fragment symphonique, for 4 pianos in quarter tones & ad. lib. percussions, Op. 31 (1946)○
- Fugues (2), for 2 pianos in quarter tones, Op. 32 (1951)○
- Transparence I, for Onde Martenot & 2 pianos in quarter tones, Op. 35 (1953)○
- Arc-en-ciel, for 6 pianos in twelfth tones, Op. 37 (1956)‡
- Études sur les densités et les volumes, for 2 pianos in quarter tones, Op. 39b (1956)○
- Quatrième fragment symphonique, for 4 Ondes Martenot & 4 pianos in quarter tones, Op. 38c (1956)○
- Poème, for Carrillo sixth tones piano, Op. 44a (1958)†
- Dialogue, for 2 pianos in quarter tones, 8 hands, without Op. (1959)○
- Sonate en un mouvement, for viola & 2 pianos in quarter tones, Op. 34 (1945–1959)○
- Composition en quarts de ton for string quartet Op. 43 (1960) Ed. Belaieff.○
- Composition II, for 2 pianos in quarter tones, Op. 46b (1960)○
- Études sur les mouvements rotatoires, for 3 pianos in sixth tones & orchestra, Op. 45b (1961)†
- Composition I, for 3 pianos in sixth tones, Op. 46a (1961)†
- Études sur les mouvements rotatoires, for 2 pianos in quarter tones, 8 hands, Op. 45a.; for chamber orchestra, Op. 45c (1961) Ed. Belaieff.○
- Intégrations, for 2 pianos in quarter tones, Op. 49 (1962)○
- Transparence II, for Onde Martenot & 2 pianos in quarter tones, Op. 47 (1962–1963)○
- Composition, for Ondes Martenot quartet, Op. 52 (1963)○
- Dialogue à deux, for 2 pianos in quarter tones, Op. 41 (1958–1973)○
- Dialogue à trois, for 3 pianos in sixth tones, Op. 51 (1973–1974)†
- Méditations (2), for 3 pianos in sixth tones, without Op. (undated)†
- Œuvre sans titre, for 3 pianos in sixth tones & piano in quarter tones, without Op. (undated)
- String Trio, Op. 53 (1979, unfinished, completed by Claude Ballif)○

Choral

Chœurs (2, words by A. Pomorsky), for mixed choir, 4 pianos in quarter tones & percussions, Op. 14 (1926)○

Theatrical

- Linnite, pantomime in 1 act & 5 scenes, for 3 voices & 4 pianos in quarter tones, Op. 25 (1937)○
- Acte chorégraphique, for bass-baritone, mixed choir, 4 pianos in quarter tones, percussions & ad. lib. instruments (viola, clarinet in C & balalaika), Op. 27 (1937–1940)○

== Writings ==
- "Liberation of sound" (in Russian). Nakanune. Berlin. January 7, 1923.
- "Раскрепощение ритма" (Liberation of rhythm). Nakanune, Berlin. March 18 & 25, 1923. 6–7, 8–9.
- "Quelques considérations sur l'emploi des quarts de ton en musique". Le monde musical. Paris, 30 juin 1927.
- "Quartertonal music, its possibilities and organic Sources", Pro Musica Quarterly. New York, 19 octobre 1927. 19–31.
- "Musique et Pansonorité". La revue Musicale IX, Paris, décembre 1927, pp 143.
- Manuel d'harmonie à quarts de ton. Paris: La Sirène Musical, 1932.

Translated by Ivor Darreg. Xenharmonikôn 6, Summer 1977.
Reissued by Éditions Max Eschig, 1980.
Translated by Rosalie Kaplan. New York: Underwolf Editions, 2017.

- "Etude sur l'harmonie par quartes superposées". Le Ménestrel. 12 Avril 1935. 125–6; 19 Avril 1935. 135–6.
- "La musique à quarts de ton et sa réalisation pratique". La Revue Musicale 171, 1937.
- "L'énigme de la musique moderne". La Revue d'esthétique, Janvier-mars 1949, pp 67–85 et avril-juin 1949, pp 181–205.
- "Préface à un traité d'harmonie par quartes superposées". Polyphonie 3,1949. 56–62.
- "Problèmes d'ultrachromatisme". Polyphonie 9–10, 1954. 129–142.
- "Les Pianos de J. Carrillo". Guide du concert et du disque, Paris, 19 janvier 1959.
- Continuum électronique et suppression de l'interprète. Cahiers d'études de Radio Télévision, Paris, Avril 1958, pp 43–53.
- "L'ultrachromatisme et les espaces non octaviants", La Revue Musicale #290–291. 71–141, Ed. Richard-Masse, Paris, 1972.
- La Loi de la Pansonorité (Manuscript, 1953), Ed. Contrechamps, Geneva, 1996. Preface by Pascal Criton, edited by Franck Jedrzejewski. ISBN 2-940068-09-7.
- Une philosophie dialectique de l'art musical (Manuscript, 1936), Ed. L'Harmattan, Paris, 2005, edited by Franck Jedrzejewski. ISBN 2-7475-8578-6.
- Libération Du Son : Écrits 1916-1979. Symétrie, 2013.

== Recordings ==
- Ivan Wyschnegradsky. Ainsi Parlait Zarathoustra (third movement), op. 17. L'Oiseau-Lyre Editions, 1938.
- Mather-Lepage. Piano Duo. McGill University Records 77002. 1977.

Concert Etude Nos. 1 & 2, op. 19; Fugue Nos. 1 & 2, op. 33; Integration Nos. 1 &2, op. 49.

- Ivan Wyschnegradsky. Vierteltonmusik. Editions Block, Berlin, 2 LP, EB 107/108. 1983.

Nr. 14,16,17,18,19 Aus 24 Préludes Dans Tous Les Tons De L'Échelle Chromatique Diatonisée À 13 Sons, op. 22; Prélude Et Étude, op. 48; Étude Sur Les Mouvements Rotatoires, op. 45; Méditation Sur 2 Thèmes De La Journée De L'Existence, op. 7; Étude Sur Le Carré Magique Sonore, op. 40; Prélude Et Fugue, op. 21; Troisième Fragment Symphonique, op. 32; Interview with composer.

- Music for Three Pianos in Sixths of Tones. McGill University Records, 83017. 1985.

Dialogue à trois op. 51; Composition op. 46, no. 1; Prélude et Fugue, op. 30.

- Ivan Wyschnegradsky. Vingt-quatre Préludes opus 22, Intégrations opus 49. Fontec records, FOCD 3216. 1988.
- Arditti String Quartet. Ivan Wyschnegradsky. Edition Block, Berlin, CD-EB 201. 1990.

String Quartet # 1–3, op. 13, 18, 38bis; Composition for String Quartet, op. 43; Trio for strings, op. 53.

- American Festival Of Microtonal Music Ensemble, Between The Keys: Microtonal Masterpieces Of The 20th Century. Newport Classic, NPD 85526. 1992.

Meditation On Two Themes From The Day Of Existence, Op. 7, transcribed for bassoon and piano by Johnny Reinhard.

- Hommage à Ivan Wyschnegradsky. Société Nouvelle d'Enregistrement, SNE-589-CD. 1994.

Transparencies I & II; 3 Compositions en quarts de ton; Cosmos.

- Martin Gelland/Lennart Wallin. Lyrische Aspekte unseres Jahrhundert. Vienna Modern Masters, VMM 2017. 1995.

Chant Douloureux Für Violine Und Klavier, op. 6; Chant Nocturne Für Violine Und 2 Klaviere Im Vierteltonabstand

- 25 Jaar Nieuwe Muziek In Zeeland. BV Haast Records/Nieuwe Muziek, CD 9501/02. 1995.

Ainsi Parlait Zarathoustra, op. 17.

- Acte Choreographique Opus 27. Mikroton, 1999.
- Wyschnegradsky. 2e2m Collection 1001, 1995.

Etudes Sur les Mouvements Rotatoires, op. 45c' Sonate, op. 34; Dialogue; Etudes sur les Densités et les Volumes, op. 39bis; Deux Chants sur Nietzsche, op. 9; Dithyrambe, op. 12.

- 50 Jaar Stichting Huygens-Fokker. Stichting Huygens-Fokker, 1999.

Etude Ultrachromatique pour l'orgue tricesimoprimal, op.42

- Ivan Wyschnegradsky/Bruce Mather. L'Evangile rouge (The Red Gospel). Société Nouvelle d'Enregistrement, SNE-647-CD. 1999.

L'Evangile Rouge, op. 8; Deux Chants sur Nietzsche, op. 9; Deux Chants Russes, op. 29; À Richard Wagner, op. 26

- Etude Sur Les Mouvements Rotatoires/24 Préludes. Col Legno, 20206. 2002.

Etude Sur Les Mouvements Rotatoires, op. 45a; 24 Préludes Dans L'Échelle Chromatique Diatonisée À 13 Sons, op. 22

- Quarter-Tone Pieces. hat[now]ART 143, 2006.

Preludes In Quarter-Tone System (excerpts); Etude Sur Le "Carré Magique Sonore", op. 40

- La Journée de l'existence. Shiiin, 4. 2009.
- Thomas Günther, Klavierwerke Um Den Russischen Futurismus Vol. 1. Cybele, 160.404. 2009.

Deux Préludes Pour Piano, op. 2; Etude Sur Le Carré Magique Sonore, op. 40

- Pianos Quart De Ton. Shiiin, 10. 2018.

4e Fragment Symphonique Op.38c Pour Ondes Martenot Et 4 Pianos; Ainsi Parlait Zarathoustra, op.17; Méditation Sur Deux Thèmes De La Journée De L'Existence, op.7
- Wyschnegradsky: Preludes I & III in Quarter-Tone System Op. 22. Elisa Järvi: In tune, tune in! – Music for quarter-tone piano. SRDG-1032. Sibarecords 2025.
