= William Ebsworth Hill =

London violin maker (1817–1895)

- Born: 1817
- Died: 1895 (aged 77–78)
- Occupations: Luthier, businessman
- Instruments: String instruments

William Ebsworth Hill (1817–1895) was a London violin maker and founder of the firm W. E. Hill & Sons.

The son of the violin maker Henry Lockey Hill, he came from a long tradition of violin makers, going back to his great-grandfather Joseph Hill. He started making violins at the age of 14 in the workshop of his father, alongside his brother Joseph Hill II, and was soon entrusted with the important job of cutting bridges and setting up instruments for the family workshop. After the deaths of his father and brother, he worked briefly for the violin maker Charles Harris in Oxford, before returning to London to work under his own name, eventually becoming internationally recognized as W. E. Hill & Sons. He did not individually produce many instruments but gained a reputation for excellence in the restoration of important instruments as well as their authentication.

In 1881, he appeared at a court case in London where he exposed Georges Chanot III who had applied a fake Carlo Bergonzi label to a violin which he then sold as genuine.
