= Kreisler Bergonzi =

Antique violin made by Carlo Bergonzi

The Kreisler Bergonzi is an antique violin made by the Italian luthier Carlo Bergonzi (1683–1747) from Cremona in 1740.

The violin is named after violinist Fritz Kreisler. After being forced to donate his Guarnerius to the Library of Congress to settle a tax debt with the United States Internal Revenue Service, Kreisler used the Bergonzi violin as his primary performance instrument for more than ten years near the end of his career. Several recordings were made by Kreisler with the Bergonzi which can be seen on the album covers on which he is holding it.

Fritz Kreisler passed the instrument onto Cuban violinist Angel Reyes who in turn made it available to Itzhak Perlman. Perlman recorded the Khachaturian Concerto on the Kreisler Bergonzi and on the cover of the album he is pictured holding it. After Perlman, the violin was played by Ruben Gonzales, who was concertmaster of the Chicago Symphony. In 1995 the instrument was purchased by the noted violin collector David Fulton who retained it until 2006 when the violin was purchased by the Dextra Musica foundation.

Of all of the extant Cremonese instruments, the Kreisler Bergonzi is one of the best preserved with its original neck and most of its original varnish. There has been very little repair work required on it. It is one of the best sounding of all Bergonzi violins.

Currently, the Kreisler Bergonzi is owned by Dextra Musica and on loan to Norwegian violinist Guro Kleven Hagen.
