= Georges Chanot III =

French luthier (1831 - 1895)

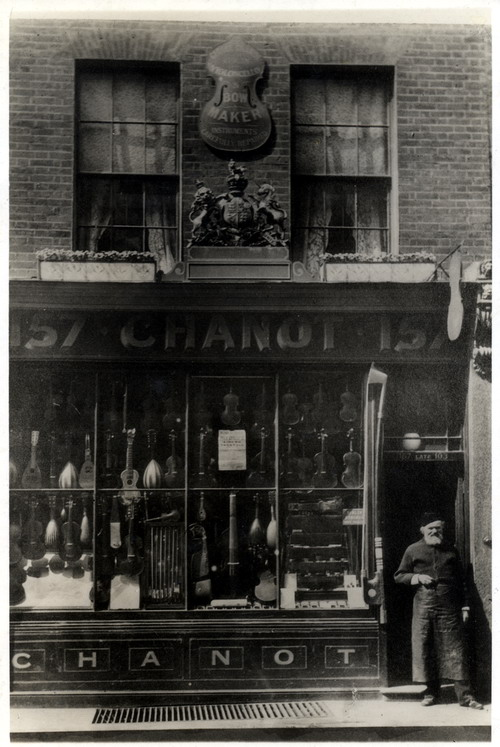
Georges Chanot III in the doorway of his shop in Wardour Street in the 1880s

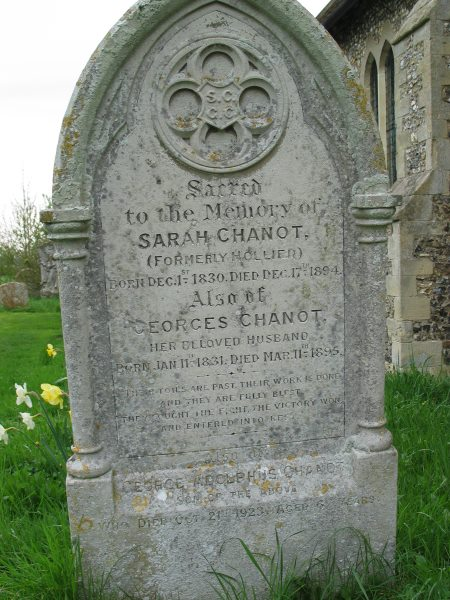
The grave of Sarah and Georges Chanot in Sydenham in Oxfordshire

Georges Chanot III (11 January 1831–11 March 1895) was a French luthier (or violin-maker) who ran a successful business in London in the late 19th century.

Born in Paris in France in 1830, the son of Georges Chanot II and the younger brother of Adolphe Chanot, he originally was apprenticed to his father George Chanot II in Paris, and later worked as an assistant to Charles Adolphe Maucotel (c.1820-1858) at Rupert Street in London from 1851-1857. When Maucotel retired Chanot bought the business and from 1858 he successfully ran it from 157 Wardour Street in the Soho district of London, mostly selling violins made by his father. However, he lived an extravagant lifestyle and spent his money as fast as he made it. In 1881 he was at the centre of a court case concerning a violin to which he had given a fake Carlo Bergonzi label and then sold as genuine. His deception was discovered by violin-maker William Ebsworth Hill but Chanot qualified his admission of guilt by claiming that this was common practice in the violin-selling business; the court was unconvinced by his explanation and found him guilty.

Despite his dubious activities Chanot established a lasting reputation as one of the best luthiers in 19th-century London. Guests to his atelier included such notable violinists as Joseph Joachim, August Wilhelmj and Henryk Wieniawski. He held a Royal Warrant as violin-maker to the Duke of Edinburgh. His violins won awards at exhibitions in Britain and in 1878 he was the only 'English' violin-maker to receive a ‘mention honourable’ at the Paris Exhibition in 1878.

He married Sarah Hollier (1830-1894) in London in 1854. His three sons, Joseph Antony Chanot, Frederick William Chanot and George Adolphus Chanot followed him in the business. The couple also had three daughters.

Georges Chanot III died in London in 1895. In his will he left £3355 5s 8d. He was buried with his wife in St Mary's churchyard in Sydenham in Oxfordshire, where his wife's family came from.
