= Spharophon =

Musical instrument

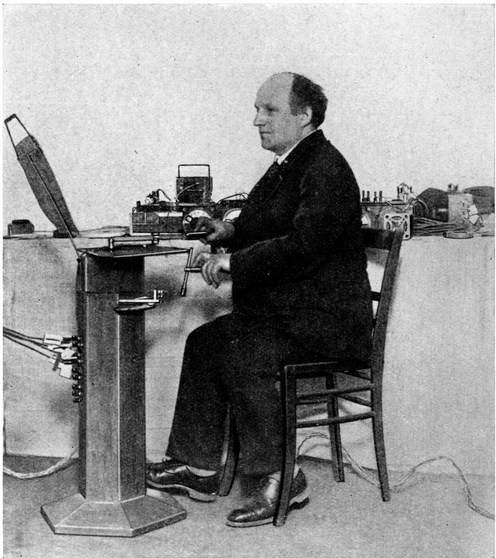
Jörg Mager playing on Spherophone at the 1926 summer music festival in the Black Forest town of Donaueschingen

The Sphärophon or a Spherophone is an electrical musical instrument that was first made as the "Electrophon" around 1921 by Jörg Mager, later modified, renamed and exhibited in 1926.

== Two variants of the Sphärophon ==
Mager invented two different variants of the Sphärophon. The first version was similar to a Theremin, but Mager's design had the capability to change the timbre of the sound that was produced as well as utilize discrete pitches. His second prototype was keyboard-based but used a radio frequency oscillator as well. This instrument was capable of producing quarter tones of an octave. In many of his instruments, including the Sphärophon, Mager experimented with the drivers in the loudspeakers to achieve different sounds as well.

== Public demonstration ==
Mager premiered his special new instrument at the Donaueschingen Festival, Germany in 1926. The festival had been started in 1921 to promote new types of music and still continues to this day in the town of Donaueschingen in southwest Germany, just north of Zurich, Switzerland,

All that is known about the Sphärophon is from pictures, witnesses’ accounts, and written records. There are no Sphärophons in existence today because they were all destroyed along with all of Mager’s instruments such as the Partiturophon and the Kaleidophon during World War II.

== See also ==
- Ondes Martenot, a keyboard-based instrument using the heterodyning method
