= Variophone =

Optical synthesizer developed by Evgeny Sholpo

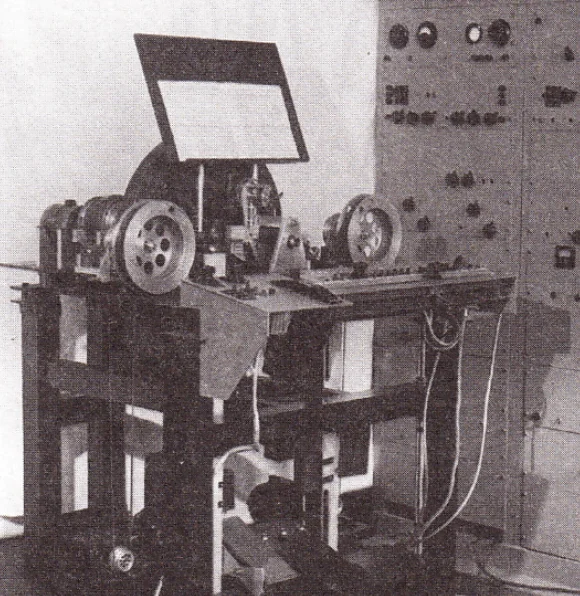
Variophone (1949)

The Variophone was an optical synthesizer that utilized sound waves cut onto cardboard disks rotating synchronously with a moving 35mm movie film while being photographed onto it to produce a continuous soundtrack. Afterwards this filmstrip is played as a normal movie by means of a film projector. Being read by photocell, amplified and monitored by a loudspeaker, it functions as a musical recording process. It was developed by Evgeny Sholpo in 1930 at Lenfilm Studio Productions, in Leningrad, the Soviet Union, during his experiments with graphical sound techniques, also known as ornamental, drawn, paper, artificial or synthetic sound. In his research Sholpo was assisted by the composer Georgy Rimsky-Korsakov.

Although with the first version of the Variophone, polyphonic soundtracks of up to 6 voices could be produced by shooting of several monophonic parts and combining them later, by the late 1930s and 1940s, some soundtracks contained up to twelve voices, recorded as tiny parallel tracks inside the normal soundtrack area.

At the same time in the Soviet Union several other artists were experimenting with similar ideas. The first artificial soundtrack ever created was drawn in 1930 by composer and musical theorist Arseny Avraamov who was working with a hand-drawn technique for producing sound effects. Nikolai Voinov, Ter‐Gevondian and Konstantinov were developing paper sound techniques. Boris Yankovsky was developing his spectral analysis, decomposition and resynthesis technique, resembling the more erecent computer music techniques of cross synthesis and the phase vocoder.

Many sound films and artificial soundtracks for movies and cartoons were produced by means of the Variophone, including the popular sound-films, often broadcast in 1930-1940s Symphony of the Piece and Torreodor. At the end of 1941 Siege of Leningrad, the Variophon was destroyed when the last missile exploded. After World War II, Evgeny Sholpo became the director of the new Scientific‐Research Laboratory for Graphical sound at the State Research Institute for Sound Recording, in Leningrad.

The fourth and final version of Variophone was not finished, despite promising experiments in musical intonation and the temporal characteristics of live musical performance. The laboratory was moved to Moscow and Sholpo was removed from his position as director. In 1951, after a long illness, Evgeny Sholpo died and his laboratory was closed.

Documentation for the Variophones was transferred to the Acoustical Laboratory at Moscow State Conservatory and later, to the Theremin Center. In 2007, several hours of graphical soundtracks produced with the Variophone were discovered in a Moscow film archive and await publishing.

== See also ==
- Daphne Oram
- Oramics
