= Frédéric Pelassy =

French violinist

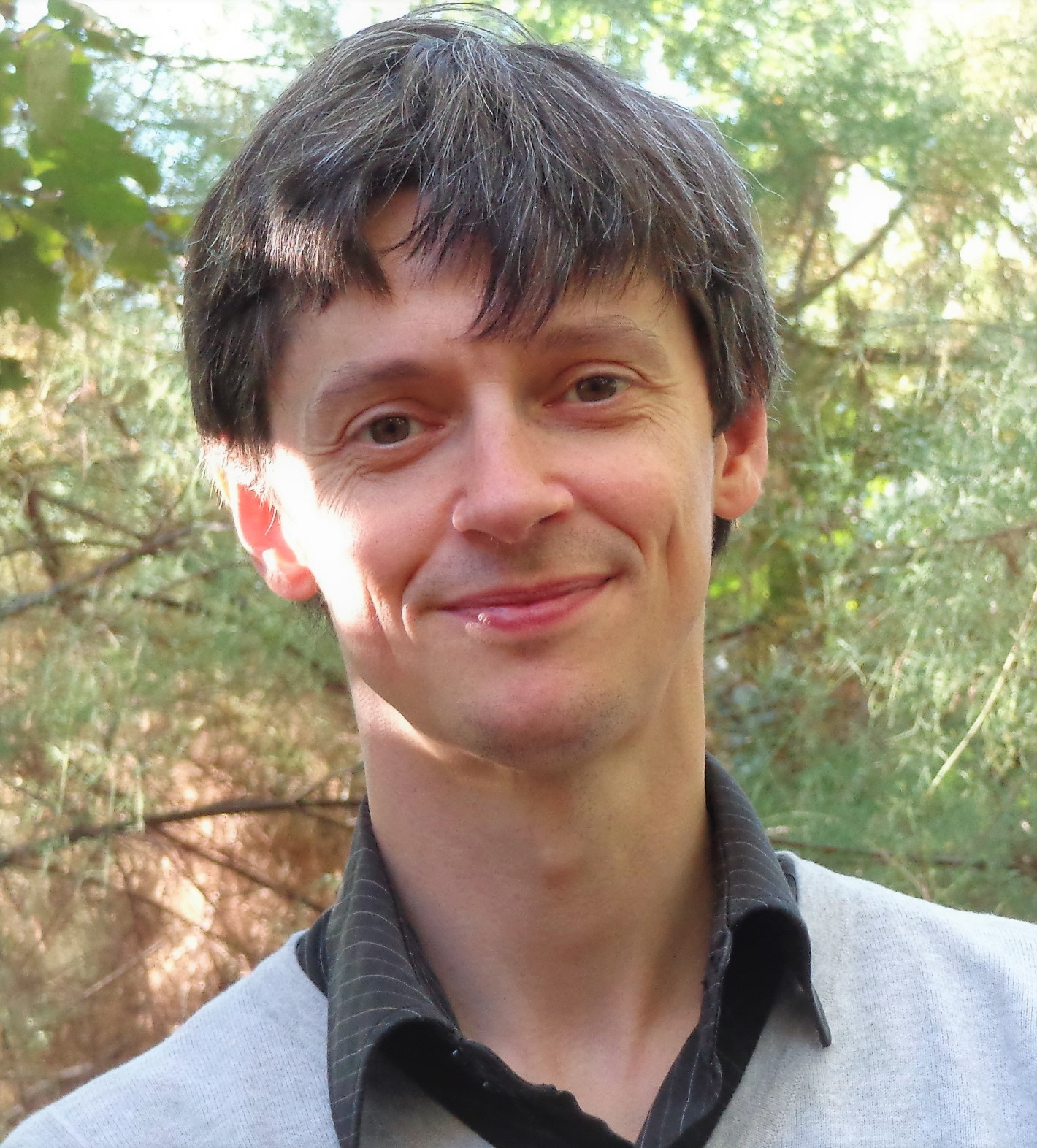
- Born: June 25, 1972 (age 54)
- Occupation: Violinist
- Website: frederic-pelassy.com

Frédéric Pelassy (born 25 June 1972) is a French classical violinist.

== Biography ==
His father, a musician, introduced him to music theory at the age of four. He then studied violin at the National School of Music in Créteil and gave his first concert with orchestra at the age of twelve. Noticed by Yehudi Menuhin and Georges Cziffra, he became a "child prodigy" sharing his time between the stage and school.

After 1986, when he was a semi-finalist at the Paganini Competition in Genoa, he followed an original course of study, hosted in several foreign institutions but not staying more than six months with each of his masters: Michèle Auclair, Sándor Végh, Alberto Lysy, Yehudi Menuhin, Mauricio Fuks, Walter Levin, Zakhar Bron.

His discography includes more than thirty volumes devoted to composers ranging from Vivaldi to Prokofiev via Bach, Haendel, Haydn, Mozart, Schubert, Beethoven, Paganini, Mendelssohn, Franck, Brahms, Bruch, Dvořák, Lalo, Tchaikovsky, Fauré, Debussy, Ysaÿe, and Bartók.

Some of his latest recordings are devoted to the rediscovery of unknown works from the French repertoire such as Théodore Dubois's concerto for violin and orchestra and Darius Milhaud's Suite for violin, clarinet and piano (Op. 157b).

He plays a violin made by the German luthier Stefan-Peter Greiner.
