= Oramics =

Drawn sound technique

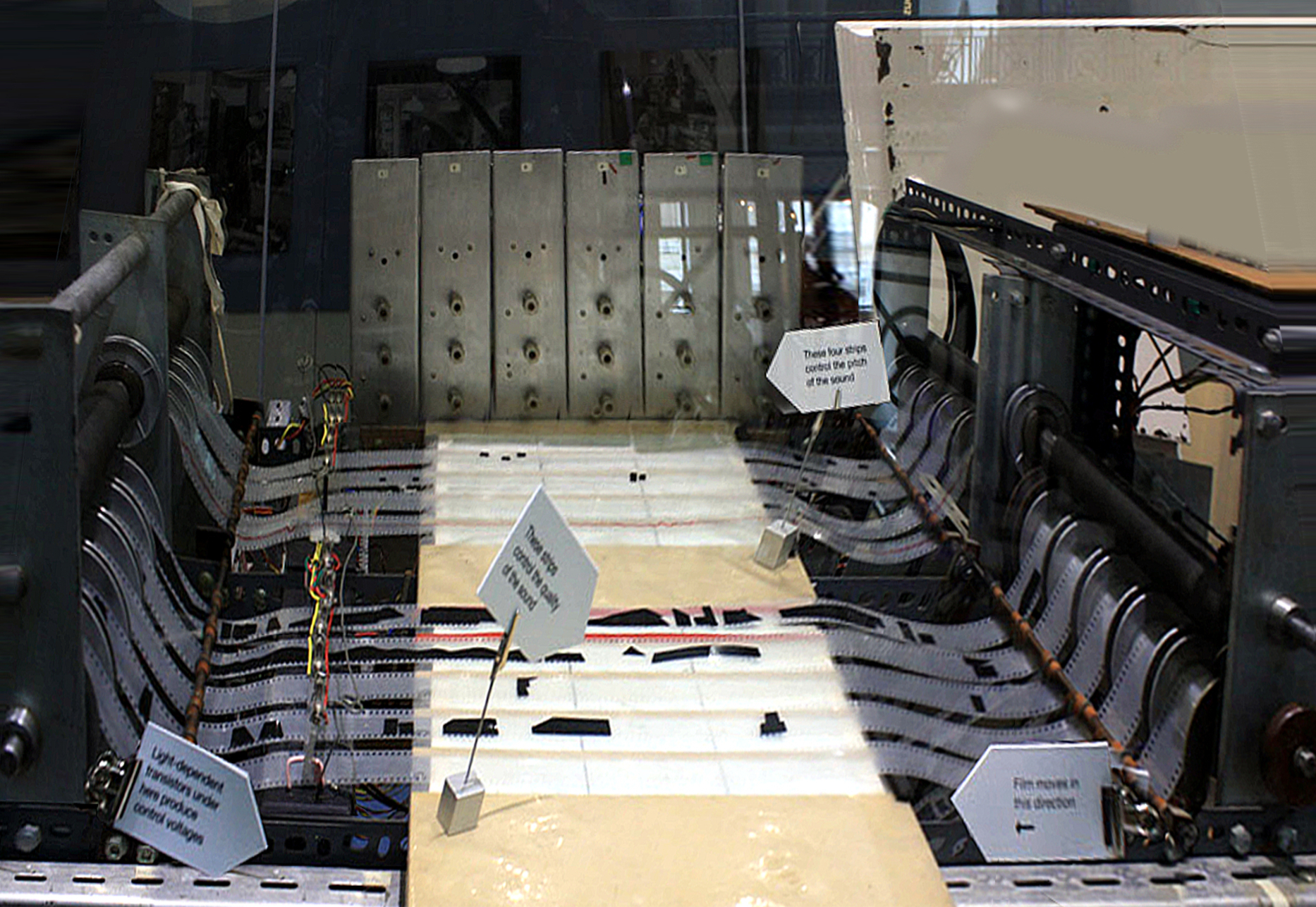
User interface of an Oramics composition machine, showing a set of 35 mm films, a drawing board (centre), film scanners (left label) and photomultiplier amplifiers (rear units) which convert shapes on the films into signals that control the pitch, timbre, amplitude, etc. of the generated sound.

Excerpt from Fanfare of Graphs, composed by Daphne Oram using Oramics.

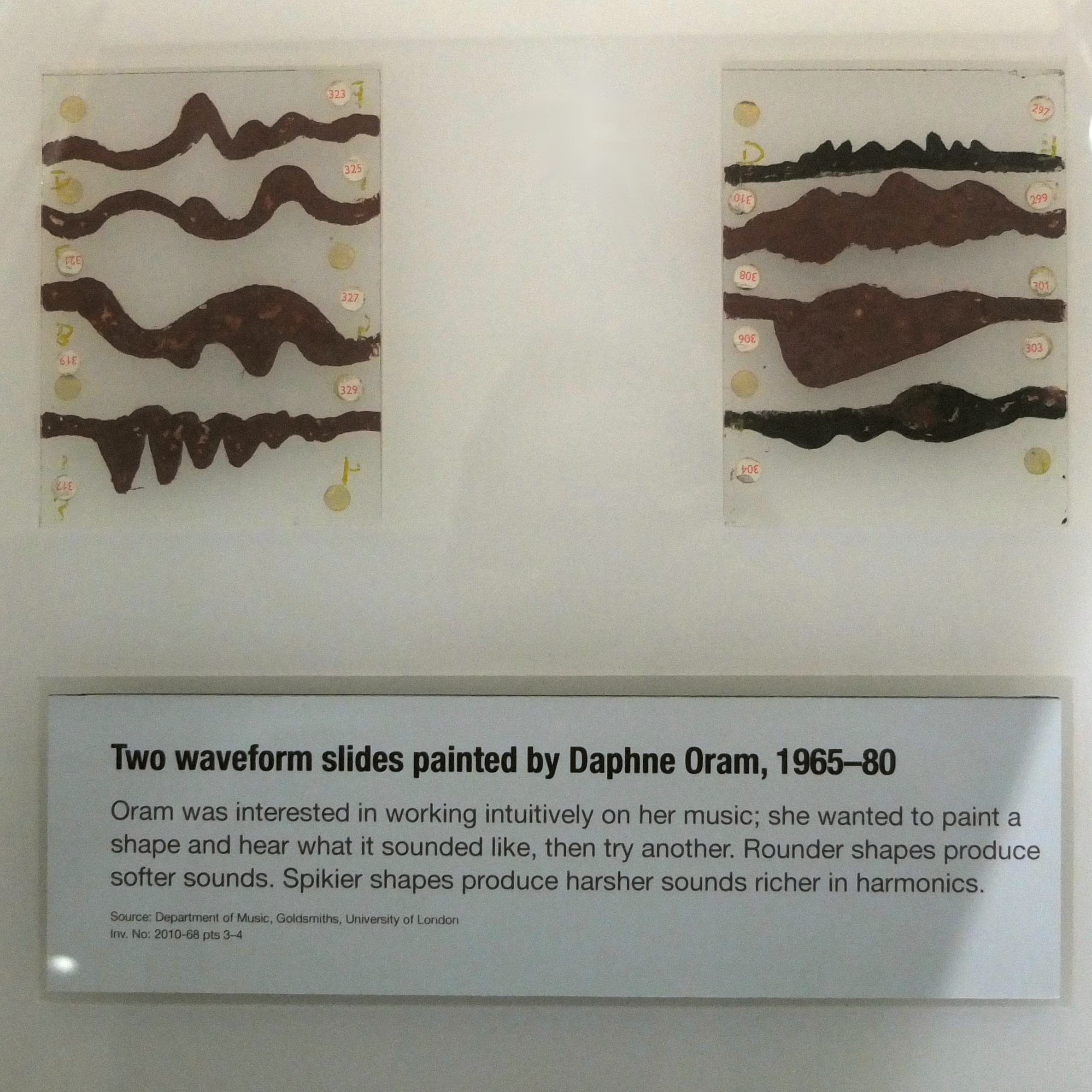
Two waveform slides painted by Daphne Oram, on display at Goldsmiths, University of London.

Oramics is a drawn sound technique designed in 1957 by musician Daphne Oram. The machine was further developed in 1962 after receiving a grant from the Gulbenkian Foundation. The technique involves drawing on 35mm film strips to control the sound produced. Oramics was also the name used by Oram to refer to her studio and business interests generally.

Oram's composition machine consisted of a large rectangular metal frame, providing a table-like surface traversed by ten synchronised strips of clear, sprocketed 35mm film. The musician drew shapes on the film to create a mask, which modulated the light received by photocells. Although the output from the machine was monophonic, the sounds could be added to multitrack tapes to provide more texture and create polyphony.

The original machine was exhibited at the Science Museum in London between 2011 and 2015.

== Related techniques ==
The Oramics machine, which creates music from graphic elements uses similar principles to the various methods of Graphical sound production appearing in the 1930s, e.g. Yevgeny Sholpo's "Variophone", which produces sound by reading shapes cut into and drawings on cardboard. Canadian filmmakers Norman McLaren and Evelyn Lambart have made films that feature sounds created by drawing or printing various patterns, such as triangles and circles, along the optical soundtrack area of the film.

In 2016 Tom Richards, a PhD Student at Goldsmiths, University of London, re-imagined and built a working Mini-Oramics machine.

== See also ==
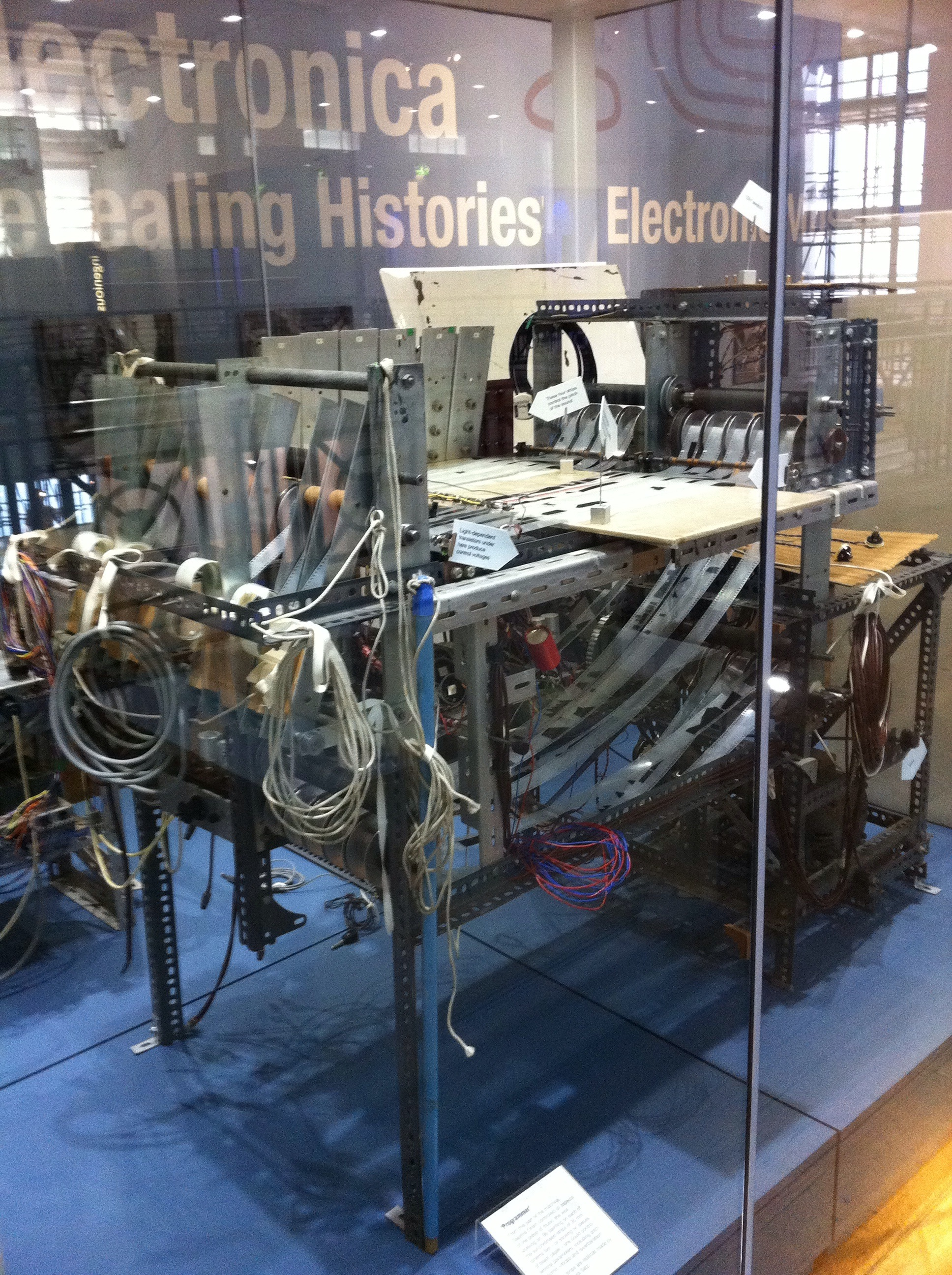
Oram's machine on display at the Science Museum, London.

- ANS synthesizer
- Variophone
- RCA Synthesizer
