= Jacques Demêtre =

French historian of blues music (1924–2020)

- Born: Dimitri Wyschnegradsky; 16 February 1924; Paris, France
- Died: 24 June 2020 (aged 96); Paris, France
- Other name: Dimitri Vicheney
- Occupations: Writer; photographer
- Known for: Historian of blues music
- Father: Ivan Wyschnegradsky

Dimitri Vicheney (born Dimitri Wyschnegradsky, 16 February 1924 – 24 June 2020), known professionally as Jacques Demêtre, was a French historian of blues music who was one of the first Europeans to recognise and support Chicago blues.

Born in Paris, he was the son of Hélène Benois, a Russian surrealist painter, and Russian-born experimental composer Ivan Wyschnegradsky. His grandfather was Alexandre Benois, a noted painter, decorator and scenographer of the Russian Ballets. During the Second World War, he listened to radio shows by Hugues Panassié, and developed an interest in jazz, particularly Django Reinhardt. However, after the end of the war he preferred listening to blues to bebop, which he disliked. A French record label, Disques Vogue, began issuing current American blues records, by John Lee Hooker, Champion Jack Dupree and others, and in 1951 Big Bill Broonzy played in Paris, accompanied by Blind John Davis. Vicheney began collecting blues records after visiting London, and was soon recruited by Charles Delaunay to write articles on blues music for the magazine Jazz Hot, using the pen-name Jacques Demêtre.

He met Sonny Terry and Brownie McGhee in 1958, and in 1959 made his first visit to the United States, with Marcel Chauvard. In the U.S., where blues music was largely overlooked by mainstream culture, he met blues musicians in Chicago, Detroit and New York City. He met, photographed and interviewed Muddy Waters, Howlin' Wolf, John Lee Hooker, Elmore James, Tampa Red, Kokomo Arnold, Champion Jack Dupree and many others, and on his return published the results in Jazz Hot. The interviews were republished in book form in 1994 as Voyage au Pays du Blue (Land of the Blues). The trip reportedly inspired English writer Paul Oliver to undertake his own research in the U.S. in 1960.

Demêtre later edited blues and gospel music compilations. He died in 2020 in Paris, aged 96.
