= W. E. Hill & Sons =

British string instrument firm

- Industry: Manufacturing, retail
- Founded: 1880; 146 years ago
- Founder: William Ebsworth Hill
- Headquarters: London, England
- Products: String instruments; Accessories
- Website: www.wehillandsons.com

W. E. Hill & Sons is a British firm based in London that specialises in violins, cellos and other string instruments, and bows. It was also known as William Ebsworth Hill & Sons or William E. Hill & Sons.

== History ==
In 1762, The name Hill was built on a long family history of violin and bow making, dates back under the luthier Joseph Hill.

Founded by William Ebsworth Hill at Wardour Street in 1880 and moved to 38 New Bond Street in 1887, ten years later relocated to 140 New Bond Street. They built workshops in Hanwell in 1887, and extended them in 1904. The firm soon gained a widespread reputation for expertise and dealing in fine instruments. They were also established as makers of instruments, bows, cases and fittings. A Hill's Certificate of Authenticity is considered definitive worldwide throughout the firm's history and their publications on Stradivari and Guarneri are still industry standards.

Many fine craftsmen worked for the firm. For much of the 20th century, the Hill workshop employed England's best bow makers, who created bows renowned for character and consistency. Hill violins, cellos and cases are also highly regarded. Their other products included varnish cleaner, violin e-strings, rosin, peg paste, music stands, chinrests, and specialist tools.

Over the years many of the most celebrated instruments by Stradivari, Amati, and Guarneri passed through Hill & Sons. They built up one of the most notable collections of stringed instruments which can be seen at the Ashmolean Museum in Oxford, including the "Messiah" Stradivari from 1716.

In the mid-1970s Hills bought 'Havenfields' in Great Missenden, Buckinghamshire and had its workshop there until 1992.

The acquisition of the company by Stefan-Peter Greiner, renowned violin maker, Simon Morris and Steven Smith, managing directors of J&A Beare, Derek Wilson, W. E. Hill & Sons bow-maker, and Robert Brewer Young, distinguished luthier, marked its return to London. The W. E. Hill & Sons workshop is located in the historic coach house and stables of Burgh House from 1704 in London Hampstead.

Under the direction of Robert Brewer Young and Stefan-Peter Greiner, violins modelled after Stradivari - including the Messiah of 1716 - notable Bergonzis, and the work of Guarneri del Gesu are being made as part of the Hill heritage.

Derek Wilson, who joined Hill in 1978, oversees the making of bows that offer the excellence of an enduring English tradition.

== Bibliography ==
- Hill, W. H.; Hill, A. F.; Hill, A. E. (1909). Antonio Stradivari: His Life and Work, 1644–1737. London: W. E. Hill & Sons. OCLC 47174898.
- Hill, William Henry (1932). The Violin Makers of the Guarneri Family: Their Life and Work. London: W. E. Hill & Sons. OCLC 23741230.
- W.E. Hill & Sons (1976). The Tuscan and the Messie. London: W. E. Hill & Sons. OCLC 3225254.
