= Sonido 13 =

Theory of microtonal music

Sonido 13 is a theory of microtonal music created by the Mexican composer Julián Carrillo around 1900 and described by Nicolas Slonimsky as "the field of sounds smaller than the twelve semitones of the tempered scale." Carrillo developed this theory in 1895 while he was experimenting with his violin. Though he became internationally recognized for his system of notation, it was never widely applied. His first composition in demonstration of his theories was Preludio a Colón (1922).

The Western musical convention up to this day divides an octave into twelve different pitches that can be arranged or tempered in different intervals. Carrillo termed his new system Sonido 13, which is Spanish for "Thirteenth Sound" or Sound 13, because it enabled musicians to go beyond the twelve notes that comprise an octave in conventional Western music.

Julián Carrillo wrote: "The thirteenth sound will be the beginning of the end and the point of departure of a new musical generation which will transform everything."

== History ==
=== Early life ===
Carrillo attended the National Conservatory of Music in Mexico City, where he studied violin, composition, physics, acoustics, and mathematics. The laws that define music intervals instantly amazed Carrillo, which led him to conduct experiments on his violin. He began analyzing the way the pitch of a string changed depending on the finger position, concluding that there had to be a way to split the string into an infinite number of parts. One day, Carrillo was able to divide the fourth string of his violin with a razor into 16 parts in the interval between the notes G and A, thus creating 16 unique sounds. This event was the beginning of Sonido 13 that led Carrillo to study more about physics and the nature of intervals.

=== Professional life ===
Carrillo became an excellent musician at the Conservatory and received a scholarship to study at the Leipzig Royal Conservatory. After Carrillo returned to Mexico in 1918, he became conductor of the National Symphony Orchestra and in 1920 he also became principal of the National Conservatory of Music. It was during this time that he began to invest a significant amount of time on Sonido 13. His achievements in this area were extensive and consisted of writing over 20 books, making more than 40 compositions, patenting fifteen pianos capable of producing small intervals, and organizing the Sonido 13 Symphonic Orchestra that performed in different parts of the world, playing microtonal music composed by Carrillo in different intervals. In 1933, Ahualulco, the town where Carrillo was born, was renamed to Ahualulco del Sonido 13 in honor of Carrillo's work.

Carrillo was, "closely associated with the Díaz regime," and preferred neo-classicism to nationalism.
