= Ángel Reyes =

Cuban-American violinist (1919–1988)

- Born: February 14, 1919; Matanzas, Cuba
- Died: November 17, 1988 (aged 69) Sarasota, Florida, USA
- Education: Conservatoire de Paris
- Genre: Classical
- Occupations: Musician; conductor; composer; professor
- Instrument: Violin

Ángel Reyes (February 14, 1919 – November 17, 1988), was a Cuban American violinist, composer, conductor and music professor.

== Biography ==
=== Early life ===
Reyes was born in Matanzas, Cuba the son of composer and musician Ángel Reyes Camejo, and was a Premier Prix graduate from the Paris Conservatory at the age of sixteen, and a prize-winner of the Ysaye International Violin Competition in Brussels.

=== Career ===
Reyes was conductor of the Thirteenth Sound Group of Havana' ,music director of the Cuban Military Police Band and a composer of Cuban traditional instrumental and vocal works.

Camejo recorded Julián Carrillo's Preludio a Colón (Prelude to Christopher Columbus) on the Columbia Records label.

As a concert soloist, he appeared with the Philadelphia Orchestra and New York Philharmonic throughout the United States, Europe, Canada and Latin America.

A Professor of Music at the University of Michigan and Northwestern University, he performed with the Northwestern Piano Trio (formed in 1959) with pianist Gui Mombaerts and cellist Dudley Powers.

He was married to Jill Bailiff, former harpist with the Philadelphia Orchestra and Professor of harp at Northwestern University and Eastern Michigan University. They had a son David, daughter Lisa, and three grandsons Braiden, Ángelo, and Ivan.

At one time he owned the famous Lipinski Stradivarius violin, on which he played Glazunov's Violin Concerto in November 1942 with the Havana Philharmonic Orchestra conducted by Massimo Freccia, as well as with the Philadelphia Orchestra conducted by Eugene Ormandy. He also owned a violin by Carlo Bergonzi, known as the "Kreisler Bergonzi", previously owned by Fritz Kreisler and later by Itzhak Perlman.

Ángel Reyes presented many master classes and adjudicated string and chamber music competitions in the U.S., Canada and France. From 1968-1983 he spent summers on the faculty of the University Division of the National Music Camp at Interlochen. Retiring as Professor Emeritus from the University of Michigan School of Music in June 1985, Reyes then established residency in Sarasota, Florida.
