= Robert Brewer Young =

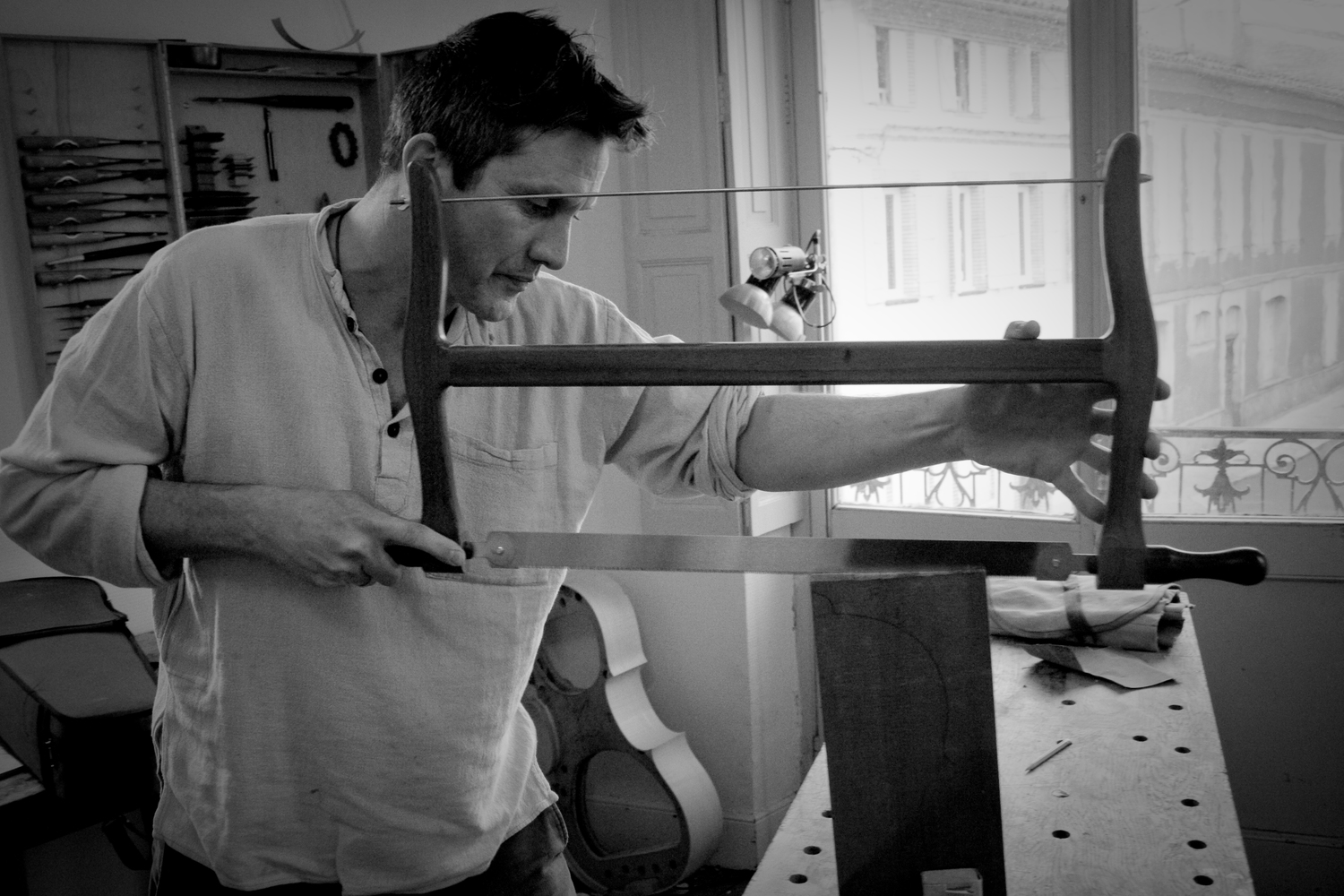
- Robert Brewer Young

Background information
- Born: 1967; Seattle
- Occupation(s): Luthier, Lecturer in Philosophy, Director of Scientific Research and Conservation, J&A Beare
- Instrument(s): Violin, Viola, Cello, Contrebass, Viola da Gamba

Robert Brewer Young (born 1967) is a contemporary cello, viola and violin maker. He received traditional French training in the violinmaking studios above Carnegie Hall, caring for and listening to the instruments of Stradivari, Guarneri, Amati, Gofriller, Guadagnini and other classical Italian luthiers. Young is now devoted to creating signature instruments in the spirit of these visionaries. As a part of a select group of makers, museum specialists and acousticians he is at the forefront of using 21st-century science to practice and advance 17th-century methods of violinmaking. He additionally uses traditional techniques and Renaissance geometrical methods to recreate the elemental harmonic properties of classical Italian instruments. He is a director at J&A Beare and the head of the Department of Scientific Research and Conservation.

Young has studios in London and Cremona.

== Education ==
Young earned a Bachelor of Fine Arts degree in photography from the San Francisco Art Institute, where he studied under Ansel Adams’ long time assistant, Pirkle Jones. He earned a master's degree in philosophy from The New School for Social Research in New York City, studying with Jacques Derrida for three years. He then earned an M.Phil. from City University of New York, doing work in the philosophy of logic and mathematics advised by Graham Priest and Saul Kripke.

Young is a professor of philosophy at the European Graduate School in Saas-Fe, Switzerland and the co-director of EGS's Research Institute for Music and Philosophy. He is a visiting scholar at Oxford University.

== Work ==
Young makes instruments for established and aspiring soloists, and does museum-level instrument restoration and conservation. Clients include: musicians from the New York Philharmonic, the San Francisco Symphony, the Berlin Philharmonic, Harvard University, the Opera National de Paris, the Stockholm Philharmonic, the Oslo Philharmonic, the Barcelona Symphony and numerous international soloists. He is the archivist for the Oberlin College group of violinmakers and for W. E. Hill & Sons and a member of the American Federation of Violin and Bow Makers.

== Charitable work ==
Since the early 1990s, Young has provided violins, violas, and cellos for charitable organizations including El Sistema programs, the New York City public school system, and schools for the blind in New York and Calcutta. He also repaired instruments for Roberta Guaspari of the Harlem School for Strings, played by Meryl Streep in the film Music of the Heart. Young provided instruments for established violin programs in indigenous southwest United States communities, and secured instruments, strings, and supplies for musicians during the Siege of Sarajevo

In 2014, Young co-founded The Open String, a non-profit organization that supports musicians in need by donating quality stringed instruments to teachers and students so that they can succeed in the growing music education movement
