= Joseph Hill (violin maker) =

English violin maker (1715–1784)

- Born: 1715
- Died: 1784 (aged 68–69)
- Occupation: violin maker

Joseph Hill (1715–1784) was a well-known violin maker working in London.

He apprenticed in the workshop of Peter Wamsley and produced fine violins, typically following the style of the Amatis. He was the first of many great London-based makers in the Hill family, including the firm W. E. Hill & Sons.
