= Julián Carrillo =

Mexican musician (1875–1965)

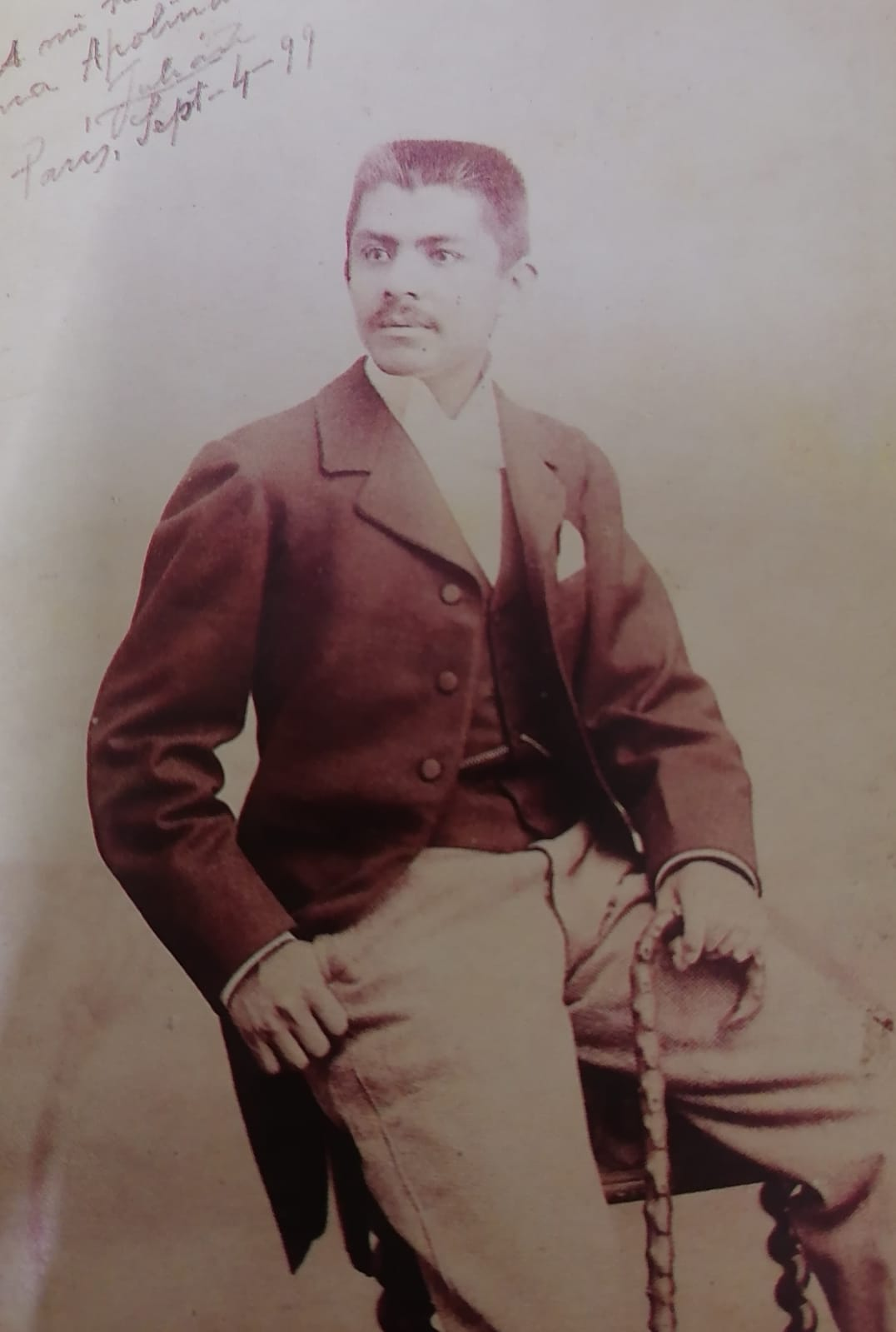
Julián Carrillo in Paris, September 4th, 1899

Julián Carrillo Trujillo (January 28, 1875 – September 9, 1965) was a Mexican composer, conductor, violinist and music theorist, famous for developing a theory of microtonal music which he dubbed "The Thirteenth Sound" (Sonido 13).

== Biography ==
Carrillo was born on January 28, 1875, in Ahualulco, a village in the state of San Luis Potosí. He was the last of the 19 children of Nabor Carrillo and Antonia Trujillo.

=== Early education ===
Carrillo sang in the children's choir of Ahualulco's church. The choir's conductor, Flavio F. Carlos, encouraged him to study music in the state capital, San Luis Potosí. He planned to study for two years, then return to Ahualulco as the church's singer, but problems prevented this plan. He arrived to San Luis Potosí City in 1885 and began to study with Flavio F. Carlos, teacher to several generations of San Luis Potosí's composers. Carrillo also began to work in his teacher's orchestra where he was a percussionist and later, violinist.

He composed his first small works for this group. Because of his family's financial situation, Carrillo left his primary school studies early, but continued working in the orchestra and studying music with Carlos. In 1894, Carrillo composed a mass that was locally successful. This, along with a letter of recommendation from the government of San Luis Potosí, allowed him to go to study in the National Conservatory of Music in Mexico City. Carrillo made quick progress in the Conservatory. His professors included Pedro Manzano (violin), Melesio Morales (composition), and Francisco Ortega y Fonseca (physics, acoustics, and mathematics).

Having not completed primary studies, he was ignorant of the acoustic basis of music—so he was fascinated when Ortega discussed laws governing generation of fundamental intervals in music. For example, when a violin string is depressed (stopped) at its midpoint, it produces a pitch twice the frequency of (an octave above) the open string. When a string is stopped at one-third, the remaining two-thirds vibrates a perfect fifth higher than the open string (almost exactly equivalent to 5/8 of an octave). Carrillo explored these relationships in experiments. For a while he tried, but couldn't divide the string further than into eight equal parts. Then he left the traditional way of dividing the string into two, three, four, five, six, seven and eight equal parts, and, using a razor to stop the string, divided the fourth string of his violin between G and A into sixteen parts. He could produce sixteen clearly different sounds within a whole tone.

From then on, he immersed himself in the study of the physical and mathematical basis of music. In 1899, General Porfirio Díaz, President of Mexico, heard Carrillo as a violinist. Díaz was impressed, and gave him a special scholarship to study in Europe.

=== Studies abroad ===
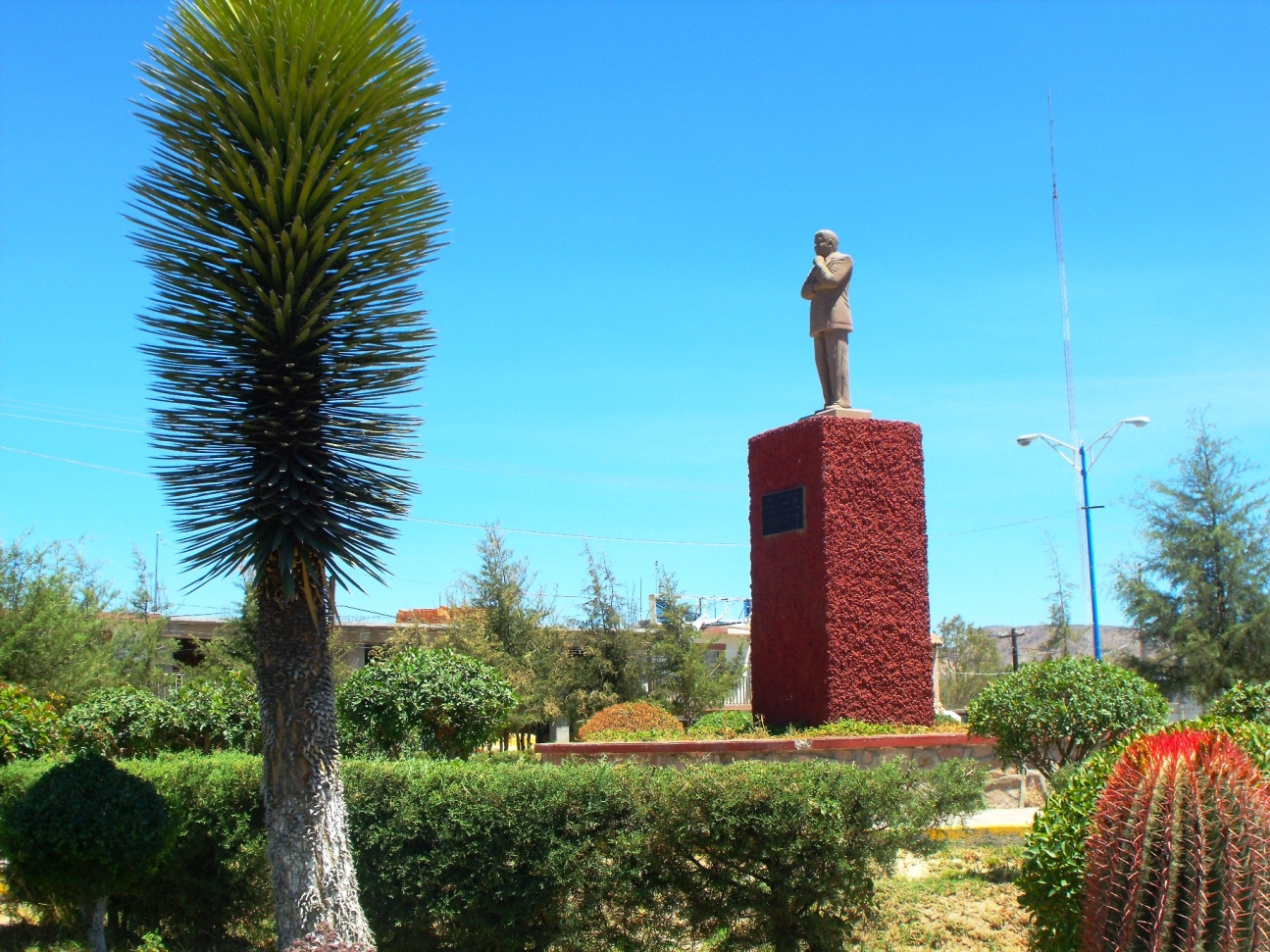
Statue of Carrillo in Ahualulco

Carrillo was admitted to the Leipzig Royal Conservatory, where he studied with Hans Becker (violin), Johann Merkel (piano), and Salomon Jadassohn (composition, harmony and counterpoint). He became first violin in two orchestras: the Conservatory's Orchestra, conducted by Hans Sitt; and the Gewandhaus Orchestra, conducted by Arthur Nikisch. Carrillo composed several works at Leipzig, including Sextet in G Major for two violins, two violas and two violoncellos (1900), and the First Symphony in D Major for Orchestra (1901). Carrillo conducted the Leipzig Royal Conservatory Orchestra in the premiere performance of his First Symphony.

In 1900, Carrillo attended the International Congress of Music in Paris, presided by Camille Saint-Saëns. He presented a paper, which the Congress accepted and published, on the names of musical sounds. He proposed that, since each note is one sound, each note name (C, D flat, etc.) should be a single syllable. He proposed 35 monosyllabic names. He also befriended Romain Rolland. When he finished his studies in the Leipzig Conservatory, he went to Belgium to improve his skills as a violinist. There, he studied with Albert Zimmer (who had been Eugène Ysaÿe's student) and was admitted to the Ghent Royal Conservatory of Music. In 1903, he composed a Quartet in E minor, which he intended to give, "ideological unity, [and] tonal variety," to classical forms.

=== Return to Mexico ===
In 1904, he won the First Award Cum Laud and with Distinction in the Ghent Conservatory International Violin Competition. Later that year he returned to Mexico where President Díaz gave him an Amati violin "as a present from the Mexican Nation" for his excellent performance in foreign countries. In Mexico City, Carrillo began intense work as violinist, orchestra conductor, composer and teacher. He was appointed professor of history (1906), composition, counterpoint, fugue and orchestration in 1908 by the National Conservatory. Among his students was José Francisco Vázquez Cano who founded the Free School of Music and Declamation, the Faculty of Music of the National University (UNAM) and the National University Philharmonic Orchestra (OFUNAM).

Other notable students were Antonio Gómezanda (pianist and composer), Rafael Ordoñez, Rafael Adame, Vicente Teódulo Mendoza (researcher of the Mexican folklore), Gerónimo Baqueiro Foster (composer and music historian and critic), Daniel Ayala, José López Alavés (composer of the famous Mexican song Canción Mixteca), Rosendo Sánchez, Leticia Euroza, Angel Badillo, Felipe Cortés Texeira, Agustin Oropeza, and Gabriel Gómez. Carrillo organized and conducted the Beethoven Symphony Orchestra (1909) and the Beethoven String Quartet (1910). He published Discursos sobre la música (Discourses on music, 1913) and Pláticas musicales (Musical talks, 1914 and 1922). In 1910 he performed for the first time his Canto a la Bandera (Song to the Flag, with lyrics by Rafael López), which has been since an official song to the Mexican Patriot Flag.

In 1911 Carrillo was official delegate to both the Musical Congress of Rome and the Musical Congress of London. At the first, he presented a report, "Reforming the great forms of composition to give symphony, concert, sonata and quartet ideological unity and tonal diversity". At the second congress, he argued a need to improve the artistic level of military bands. Each report was approved by its respective congress. In 1913 Carrillo was nominated Principal of the National Conservatory. There he amended the curriculum, putting more emphasis on rigorous musical technical preparation as well as literature and Spanish language. That year he was admitted as a member of the Mexican Society of Geography and Statistics.

=== Birth of the "Thirteenth Sound" ===
When Victoriano Huerta's government was overthrown, Carrillo had to flee to the United States. In New York City, he organized and conducted the Symphony Orchestra of America. He performed his First Symphony in New York. The success of this work was so great that a journalist named him "the herald of a musical Monroe Doctrine". In 1916, Carrillo composed music for D. W. Griffith's film, Intolerance. In New York, Carrillo also wrote the "Thirteenth Sound Theory" which was published later in the second volume of Musical Talks.

=== Return home ===
In 1918, he came back to Mexico, where he was chosen to conduct the National Symphony Orchestra (1918–1924) which had been the Conservatory's Orchestra. He was also named Principal of the National Conservatory (1920–1921). Carrillo led the National Symphony Orchestra to performance excellence. Renowned pianist Leopold Godowsky said the orchestra was superior to the New York Philharmonic Orchestra. The National Symphony Orchestra was so popular, it could be sustained by its own economic resources. With his orchestra, Carrillo introduced Mexico to the music of Bach, Mozart, Beethoven, Weber, Wagner, Tchaikovsky, Rimsky-Korsakoff, Richard Strauss, Saint-Saëns, Debussy and Ravel.

He directed two Beethoven Festivals in 1920 and 1921. He also introduced Mexican composers Manuel M. Ponce, Antonio Gómezanda, Juan León Mariscal, and himself, among others. In 1920, Julián Carrillo described his Thirteenth Sound Theory through the Mexican press and in conferences. It stated that, given the evolution of the musical system, the next step of musical composition must be the use of intervals smaller than half tones. He cited examples from his earlier experiments. The Thirteenth Sound Theory was not well received. Some enthusiastic people (most of them Carrillo's students) supported it, but others attacked it and its author. They said it was impossible to perceive such little intervals but, even if possible, Carrillo had stolen the idea from European musicians. The main opponent was "Group 9", consisting of seven musicians, a physician, and a lawyer. Carrillo's followers organized themselves as "Group 13". The two groups confronted each other to defend their positions through press, broadcasts and conferences.

This debate is known as the Thirteenth Sound Polemic and was supported principally by the Mexico City's daily El Universal. The polemic culminated with a concert by the Group 13 on February 15, 1925. The program included several compositions of Carillo and his students in quarter-, eighth- and sixteenth-tones, performed with adapted instruments and specially trained voices. From September to November 1925, Carrillo made a Thirteenth Sound excursion through several cities of the country. In December 1925, Carrillo presented the Thirteenth Sound in Havana. In 1926 he arrived in New York City. There, he edited a few issues of the bilingual musical magazine The Thirteenth Sound: The Herald of America's Musical Culture.

The League of Composers commissioned a microtonal work. He wrote the Sonata casi fantasía in quarter-, eighth- and sixteenth-tones. It was performed for the first time in Town Hall on March 13, 1926. Then, Leopold Stokowski commissioned a Carrillo work, the Concertino in quarter-, eighth- and sixteenth-tones, which Stokowski and the Philadelphia Symphony Orchestra performed in New York and Philadelphia. At that time, Carrillo wrote Leyes de Metamórfosis Musicales (Musical Metamorphosis Laws), a method to transform the tonal proportions of a work. For example, half tones become whole tones and whole tones become double tones; or half tones become quarter tones and quarters become eighths, and so on. In addition, these laws present a compositional process similar to serialism. He also wrote Pre-Sonido 13: Rectificación básica al sistema musical clásico—Análisis físico musical (Pre-Thirteenth Sound: Essential Rectification to classical musical system—Physical musical analysis) and Teoría lógica de la música (Logical Theory of Music).

When he came back to Mexico, State of San Luis Potosí's government honored him for the Thirteenth Sound. It declared July 13 (anniversary of the 1895 experiment) as State Day of Honor. The National Flag was raised over Carrillo's house from 6 am to 6 pm. Despite governmental recognition, Carrillo didn't receive economic support for his musical revolution. Opponents put obstacles to his working as a conductor and professor of music. After that, he rarely was invited to conduct in Mexico and his music seldom performed. The former Principal of the National Musical Conservatory and titular Conductor of the National Symphony never obtained similar jobs again, in spite of his abilities and experience. He had to pay for his own musical research, making musical instruments, publishing his compositions, et cetera. In 1930, Carrillo organized the Thirteenth Sound Symphony Orchestra, in which all the musical instruments could perform microtones.

From 1930 to 1931 Carrillo and Leopold Stokowski conducted this orchestra. In New York City on February 7, 1930, Ángel Reyes, principal of the Thirteenth Sound Group of Havana, recorded the Preludio a Colón (Prelude to Christopher Columbus) for the Columbia label. That year, the town of Ahualulco was officially renamed Ahualulco del Sonido 13. In 1934, Carrillo published La revolución musical del Sonido 13 (The Thirteenth Sound Musical Revolution), which gave the historical background of his revolution. In 1940 he published another book, Génesis de la Revolución Musical del Sonido 13 (Genesis of the Thirteenth-Sound Musical Revolution).

=== Pianos and metamorphosis ===
In 1940, Carrillo patented fifteen metamorphoser pianos for producing whole tones, third-tones, quarter-tones, fifth-, sixth-, seventh-, eighth-, ninth-, tenth-, eleventh-, twelfth-, thirteenth- fourteenth-, fifteenth-, and sixteenth-tones. Each piano produced one set of intervals but all of these pianos have sets of 96 keys unlike common pianos. The piano with quarter-tones could produce four full octaves and the piano with sixteenth-tones only one. In contrast, Wyshnegradsky's piano for quarter-tones has three sets of 88 keys. In 1941 Carrillo published Método racional de solfeo (Rational method of solfeggio). Its guiding idea is that a person has to proceed from known things to discover new things. So his exercises for singing are variations on the Mexican National Anthem. In 1947 he conducted experiments at New York University examining the node law that prevailed at the time and showed that it had to be modified. His reasoning followed from the fact that a node is not a mathematical point but a physical point. If a violin string is stopped below halfway, the frequency of the bowed fraction is more than twice the frequency of its base note.

Carrillo later extended his work on musical physics (the node law and harmonic law) in Dos leyes de física musical (Two laws of musical physics, Mexico City, 1956)In 1949, the first metamorphoser piano was made for third-tones and Carrillo brought it to the Paris Musical Conservatory the next year. In France, he met Jean-Étienne Marie, who spread Carrillo's theories in Europe.

Carrillo lectured in France, Spain and Belgium. In 1951 Carrillo produced a concert in the Esperanza Iris Theatre of Mexico City to demonstrate the musical metamorphosis laws. That year, in Pittsburgh, Leopold Stokowski performed for the first time Horizontes: Poema sinfónico (Horizons: Symphonic Poem for violin, cello and harp in quarter- eighth- and sixteenth-tones). The concert was so successful that Stokowski had to repeat the complete work. Next year, Stokowski performed Horizontes in Washington, Baltimore and Minneapolis. In 1954 he donated a metamorphoser piano for third-tones to the Schola Cantorum of Paris. In 1956, France's president decorated Carrillo with the badge of Knight of the Legion of Honor. Germany's government decorated Carrillo with the Great Cross of the Order of Merit. In 1958 Carrillo showed his 15 metamorphoser pianos at the Brussels' World Exposition. They won a gold medal. Then the pianos were shown in the Gaveau Hall in Paris. Julián Carrillo, Ivan Wyschnegradsky and Alois Hába met in Paris where they were all participating in the International Congress of Music that year. Carrillo performed in concert at UNESCO.

=== Later years ===
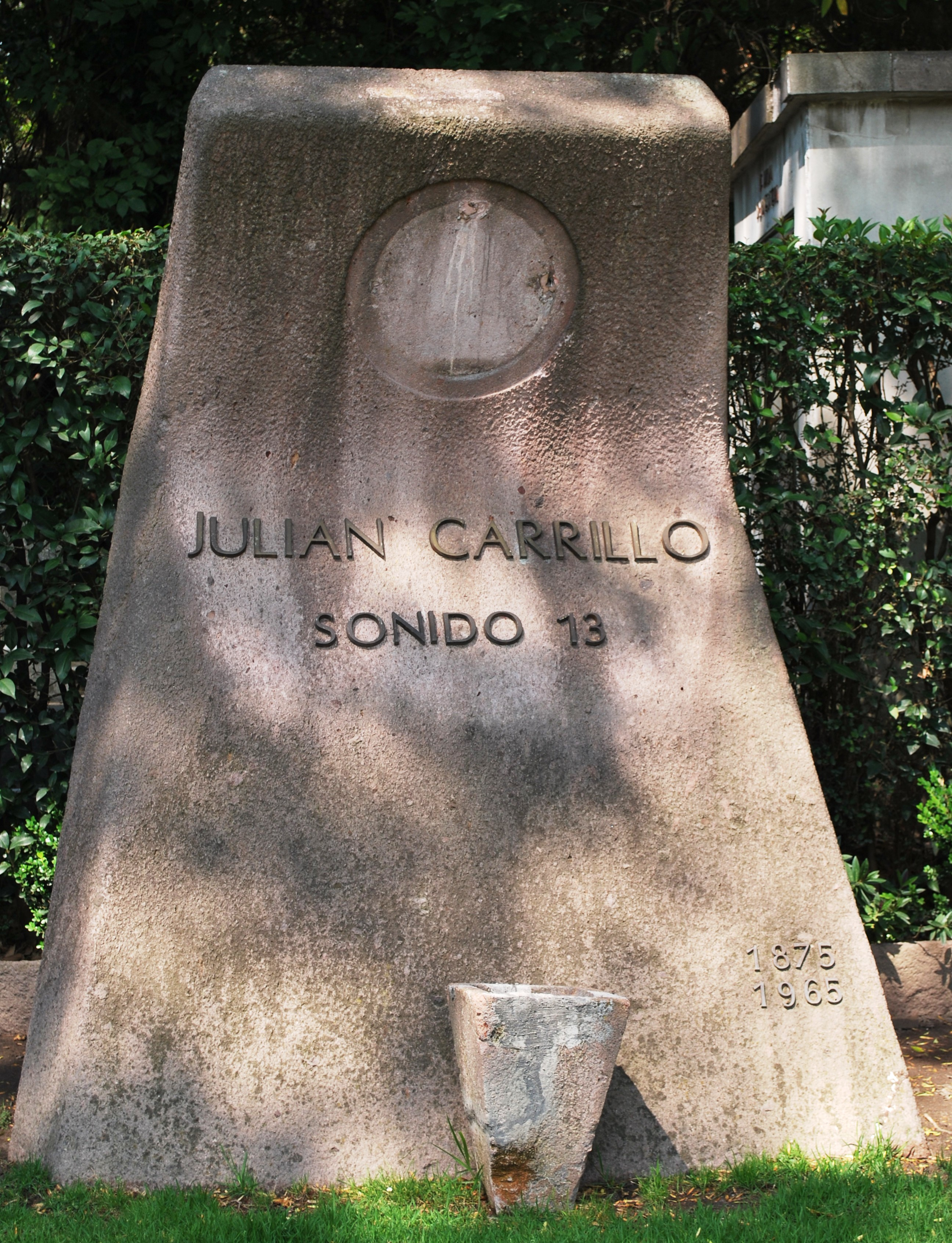
Tomb of Julian Carrillo in the Rotunda of Illustrious Persons

From 1960 to 1965 Carrillo recorded about thirty musical works with the Lamoureaux Concerts' Association Symphony Orchestra with renowned French musicians like Jean-Pierre Rampal, Bernard Flavigny, Robert Gendre, and Reine Flachot. These records were made by Philips in Paris. Jean-Etienne Marie was the sound engineer. In 1960 Carrillo composed his Canon atonal a 64 voces (Atonal Canon for 64 Voices); the Misa de la Restauración dedicada a Juan XXIII (Mass of the Restoration dedicated to Pope John XXIII for male voices acapella in quarter-tones); Balbuceos (Babbles for metamorphoser piano in sixteenth-tones and orchestra).

This last work was commissioned by Leopold Stokowski and performed for the first time in Houston. In Paris during 1963, Carrillo won the Great Award of Latin American Music. He lectured in the Mexican Embassy in London and was interviewed by the BBC. The Times of London published an article from their Mexico City correspondent:

The grand old man of Mexican music, Julián Carrillo, has spent his life peering into an unsuspected microtonic world of sound. He has shattered and then remade our chromatic scale, and we might be tempted to call him the atom-splitter of music, except that the name gives no idea of the rich emotional world he has opened. ... This was a more startling revolution than when Terpander, in Greece 26 centuries ago, added two notes to the Chinese five-tone scale.

In 1964 Robert Gendre premiered Carrillo's First Violin Concerto in quarter-tones. That year, Carrillo wrote several works: three sonatas for viola in quarter-tones, a Sonata for violin in quarter-tones, the Second Violin Concerto in quarter-tones, and several atonal canons. Mexico's government awarded him the Civic Merit Medal because of the anniversary of the Canto a la Bandera (Song to the National Flag).

In 1965 the USSR invited Carrillo to perform several concerts across the country, but he died before it could be a reality. He also won the Sibelius Award of Finland, with the support of the most important musical institutes of France, Argentina, Brazil, and Mexico, but his death prevented his receiving it personally. Carrillo died in Mexico City on September 9, 1965. His remains were interred at the Rotunda of Illustrious Persons.
