= Preludio a Colón =

Preludio a Colón (Prelude to Christopher Columbus), for soprano in fifths of a tone, flute, guitar, and violin in quarter tones, octavina in eighth-tones, and harp in sixteenth-tones, is a musical composition by the Mexican composer Julián Carrillo, written in 1922.

== Composition ==
The Preludio is Carrillo's best-known composition. It was composed in 1922 and first published (under the slightly altered title Preludio a Cristobal Colón) in Henry Cowell's New Music Quarterly in 1944. The first performance took place in Mexico City on 15 February 1924, as part of a concert of microtonal music, responding directly to a request from José Gómez Ugarte, the editor of El Universal. Four other works by Carrillo were also on the program (Prelude for obligato cello in quarter tones accompanied by instruments in quarter-, eighth-, and sixteenth-tones; Tepepán for soprano and chorus in quarter-tones with harp in sixteenth-tones; Hoja de Album for instruments in quarter=, eighth=, and sixteenth=tones; and Testimonio de una vida), along with several works by his students, Rafael Adame, Elvira Larios, and Soledad Padilla.

It was first recorded for Columbia Records in 1928 by the Havana "Grupo 13", conducted by Ángel Reyes. Other sources, however, give later dates for when this recording was made: two takes on 7 February 1930 in New York, or even not until some time in the 1940s.

A harp specially constructed for Carrillo's microtonal music, called arpacitera, plays 16th-tone glissandos as a superficial addition to the principal lines. The guitar is adapted for quarter-tone playing by the addition of extra frets, and the octavina (also known as guitarrón, a large bass guitar familiar from mariachi bands) is similarly fitted with extra frets for playing eighth tones. The latter instrument is also described as an "altered bass".

By the time of the 1944 publication of the score, Carrillo had made a new version, re-notated in a system of his own devising. This version of the score, dated 13 November 1934, dispenses with the conventional staff in favor of using numerals to indicate pitches (with the soprano part now in quarter tones like the flute, guitar, and violin), but retains the familiar rhythmic signs.

Four years after the composer's death, a third version of the work was published, which is re-scored for soprano, flute, string quartet, sixteenth-tone harp, and (optional) quarter-tone guitar. The date and circumstances of this version are not mentioned in the publication.

== Recordings ==
- 13th Sound Ensemble of Havana; Ángel Reyes (conductor). Columbia 50216-D (98677 (matrix), 98678 (matrix)). New York: Columbia Records, [ca. 1930]. Reissued ca. 1936 and ca. 1939 as Columbia 5115-M and 7357-M, respectively.
- Annik Simon (soprano); Gabrielle Devries (violin); Reine Flachot (cello); Monique Rollin (harp). Version III, without guitar. LPL 385. Mexico: Sonido 13 (c. 1965)
- Meredith Borden (soprano); American Festival of Microtonal Music Ensemble (version III, with guitar). Pitch 200203 (2004).
- Mitsuko Shirai: Jubilee Edition. Mitsuko Shirai (soprano); Roswitha Staege (flute); Bernd Buss and Ronald Hoogeveen (violins); Rainer Sachtleben (viola); Frank Wolff (cello); Monique Rollin (harp); Juan Pablo Izquierdo (conductor). Capriccio 5324 (2017).
