= Carlo Bergonzi (luthier) =

Italian luthier (1683–1747)

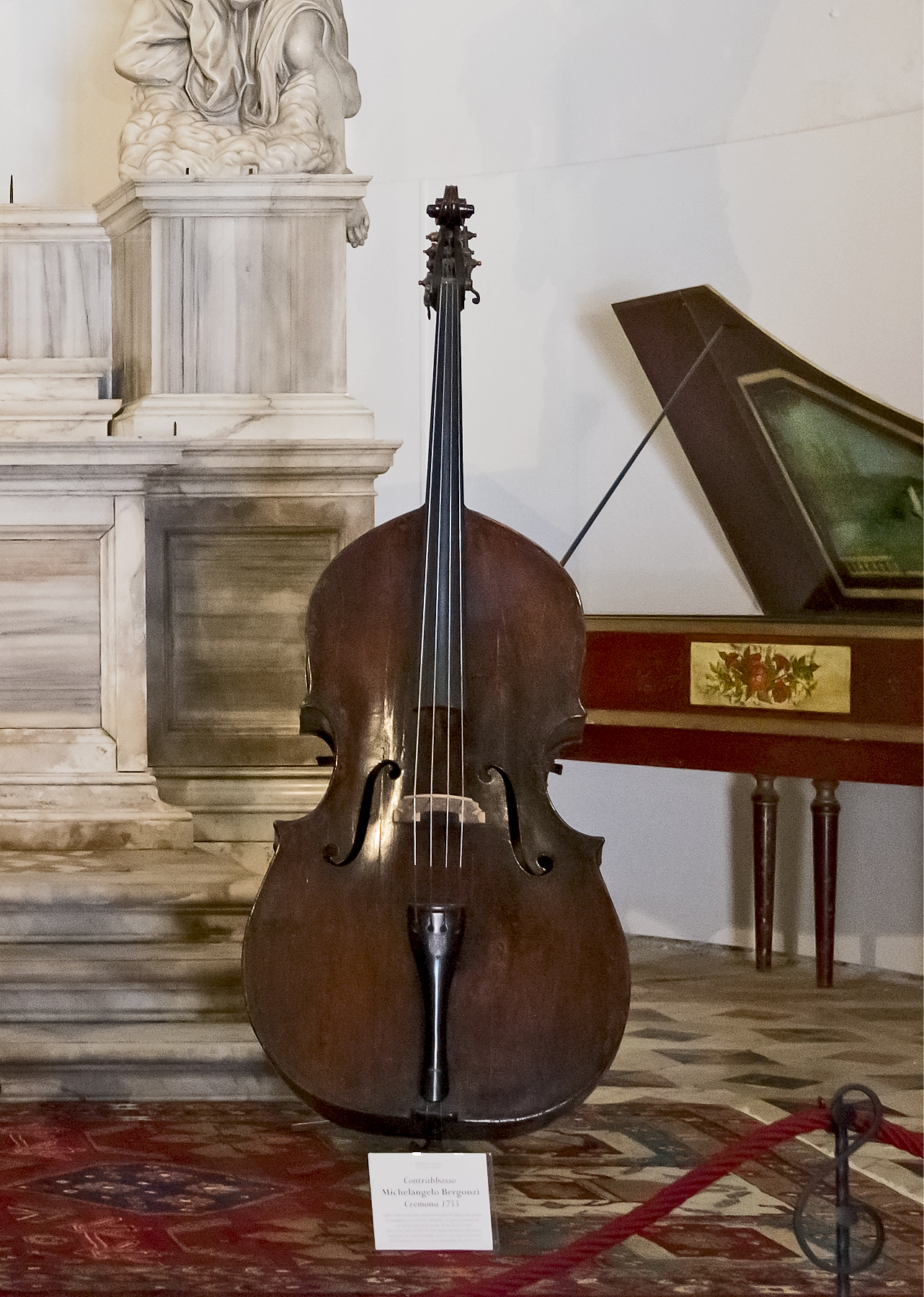
- Carlo Bergonzi – Double bass
- Born: December 21, 1683; Cremona, Italy
- Died: February 9, 1747 (aged 63)
- Occupation: luthier
- Known for: High-quality string instruments

Carlo Bergonzi (21 December 1683 – 9 February 1747) was an Italian luthier and is the first and most prominent member of the Bergonzi family, a distinguished group of luthiers from Cremona, Italy, a city with a rich tradition of stringed instrument makers. Today his instruments are highly valued for their workmanship and tone. Although he was historically assumed to have first apprenticed with Hieronymus Amati or Antonio Stradivari, he is now known to have been the student of Vincenzo Rugeri.

== Early life and career ==
Carlo Bergonzi and his family lived close to the workshop in Cremona of Vincenzo Rugeri and would have been the most obvious place for apprenticeship for Carlo given the social and financial connections between the two families. When comparing the work of Bergonzi with Vincenzo Rugeri, their similarity of work is obvious in the treatment of the scrolls and the working technique of scarfing the linings into the corner blocks at an angle instead of square. The early violins of Carlo's career follow similar outlines as Vincenzo Rugeri's violins as could be expected, however the outlines of later instruments became his own. Antonio Stradivari and Guarneri del Gesu also had an influence upon Carlo Bergonzi's work. Carlo Bergonzi eventually moved into the Casa Stradivari in 1746 after the master's death in 1737 and even completed some of the unfinished violins by Antonio Stradivari.

== Violins ==
Bergonzi labels vary, but typically record date, name, and location:

Anno 1733, Carlo Bergonzi
fece in Cremona

In 1740, he created one of his finest violins, the Kreisler Bergonzi, which was subsequently named after violinist Fritz Kreisler. It was then owned by Cuban violinist, Angel Reyes. Professor Reyes sold the violin to Itzhak Perlman. Both Kreisler and Perlman performed and recorded with it.

It is known that many instruments that bear his label are inauthentic. A cello once owned by Pablo Casals was for many years thought to be a Bergonzi because of the label it bore indicated: "Carlo Bergonzi . . . 1733." It was later found to have actually been made by Matteo Goffriller. In 1881 a sensational court case was held in London over claims that the well-known luthier Georges Chanot III had given a fake Bergonzi label to a violin and then sold it as genuine. His deception was discovered by violin-maker William Ebsworth Hill but Chanot qualified his admission of guilt by claiming that this was common practice in the violin-selling business; the court was unconvinced by his explanation and found him guilty.

== Bergonzi family of luthiers ==
- Michele Angelo (ca. 1722–1758), eldest Son of Carlo I.
- Zosimo (ca. 1725–1777), younger Son of Carlo I.
- Carlo II. (1758–1838 Cremona), younger son of Zosimo
- Nicola (ca. 1746–1796) eldest son of Zosimo
