= Jörg Mager =

German musician and inventor (1880–1939)

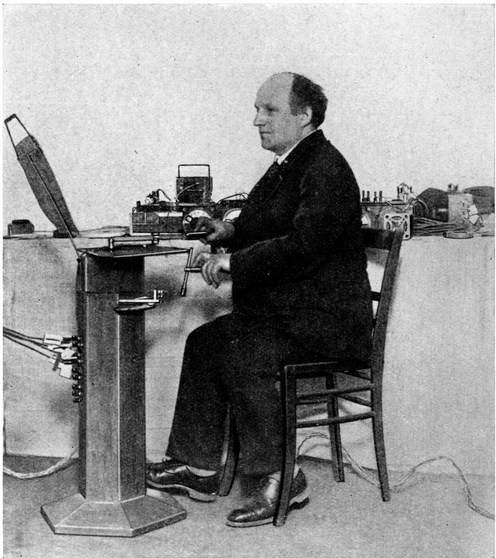
- Jörg Mager playing on Spherophone at the 1926 summer music festival in the Black Forest town of Donaueschingen

Background information
- Born: 6 November 1880; Eichstätt, Bavaria
- Died: 5 April 1939; Aschaffenburg, Bavaria
- Genres: Electronic
- Occupation(s): Musician and inventor

Jörg Georg Adam Mager (6 November 1880 – 5 April 1939) was a German musician and inventor, who was a pioneer of early electronic music.

== Life ==
Mager was born in Eichstätt in Bavaria, in 1880. An idealist by nature, he worked as a schoolteacher and organist to fund his research into electronic instruments. In 1911, after hearing an organ that had become slightly detuned due to temperature variations, Mager began researching quarter tones, and built a harmonium based on quarter-tonal divisions. This became the basis for many of his later instruments.

In the 1920s, Mager developed the Electrophon (later renamed to the Sphärophon), a keyboard instrument that produced sound using heterodyning. Its premiere at the 1926 Donaueschingen Festival was well received by the attendees, including Paul Hindemith and Alois Hába. In the late 1920s, Mager received a government grant, and used this money to found a laboratory near Darmstadt; he also began an Electronic Music Society at around the same time. At his laboratory Mager designed and constructed an organ which he used alongside a huge array of amplifiers, aluminium pots, glass plates, oven pipes and the wooden frame of a cello which used a frying pan as an additional amplifier. All of these were linked to the organ by wires to produce the 'tonal colours' Mager experimented with.

Mager was among the first musicians to begin serious discussion of electronic music, with his 1924 essay Eine neue Epoche der Musik durch Radio ("A New Epoch in Music through Radio").

Although he created a number of unique electronic instruments, including the Kurbelsphärophon and the Kaleidophon, all of his examples were destroyed by Allied bombing raids during World War II.

== Gallery ==
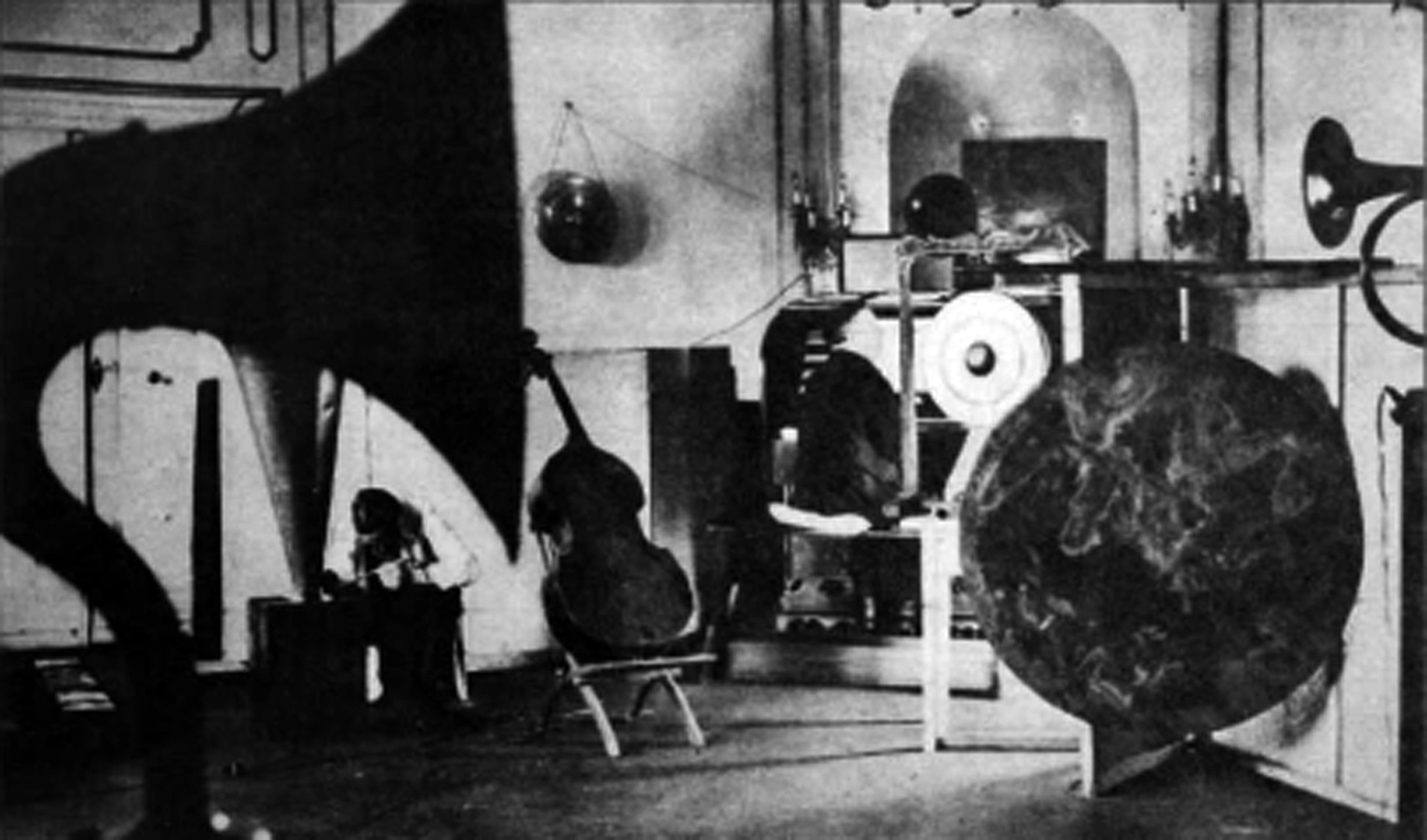
Laboratory of Jörg Mager, c. 1938, photographer unknown, PIX Magazine

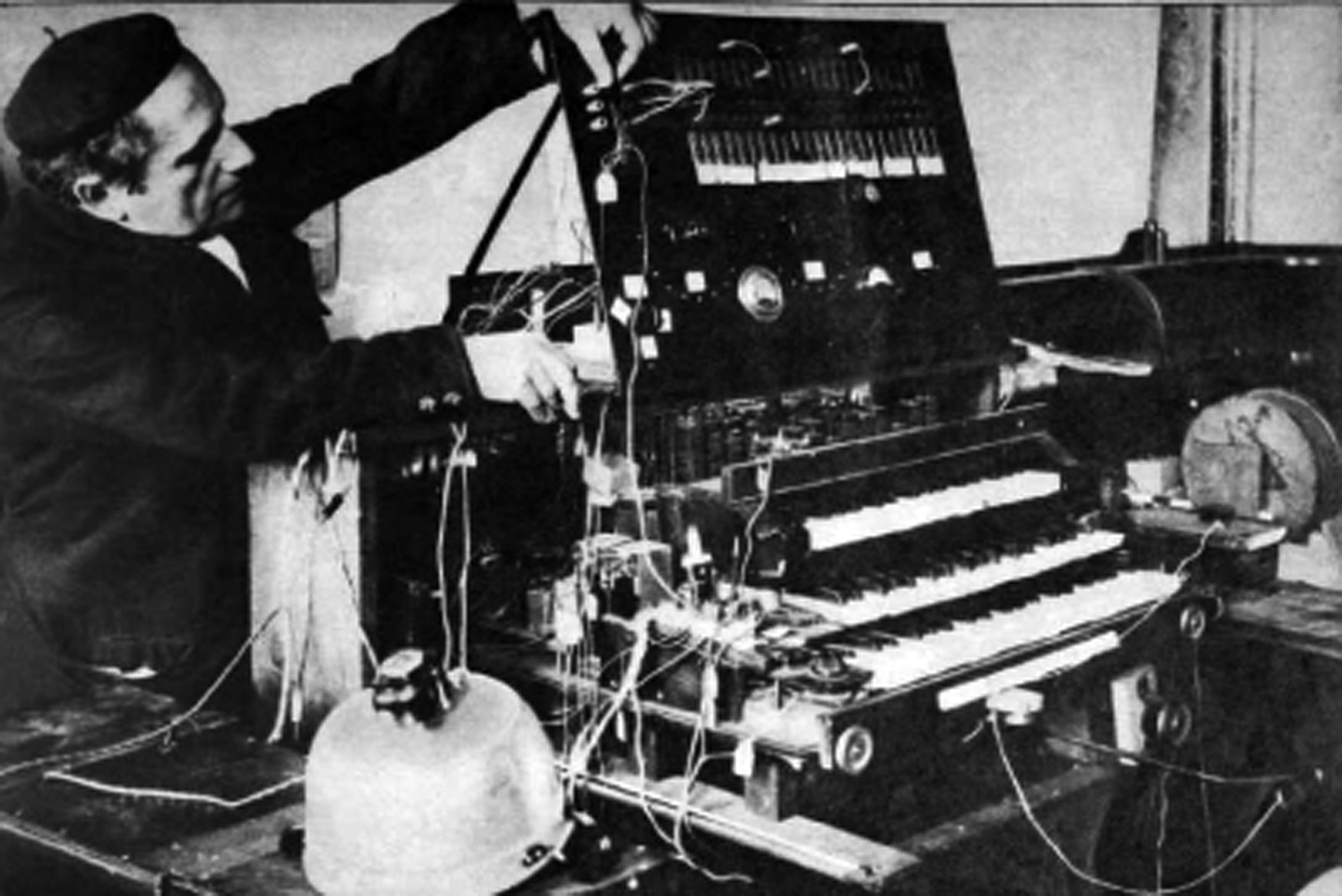
Jörg Mager working on his organ, c. 1938, photographer unknown, PIX Magazine

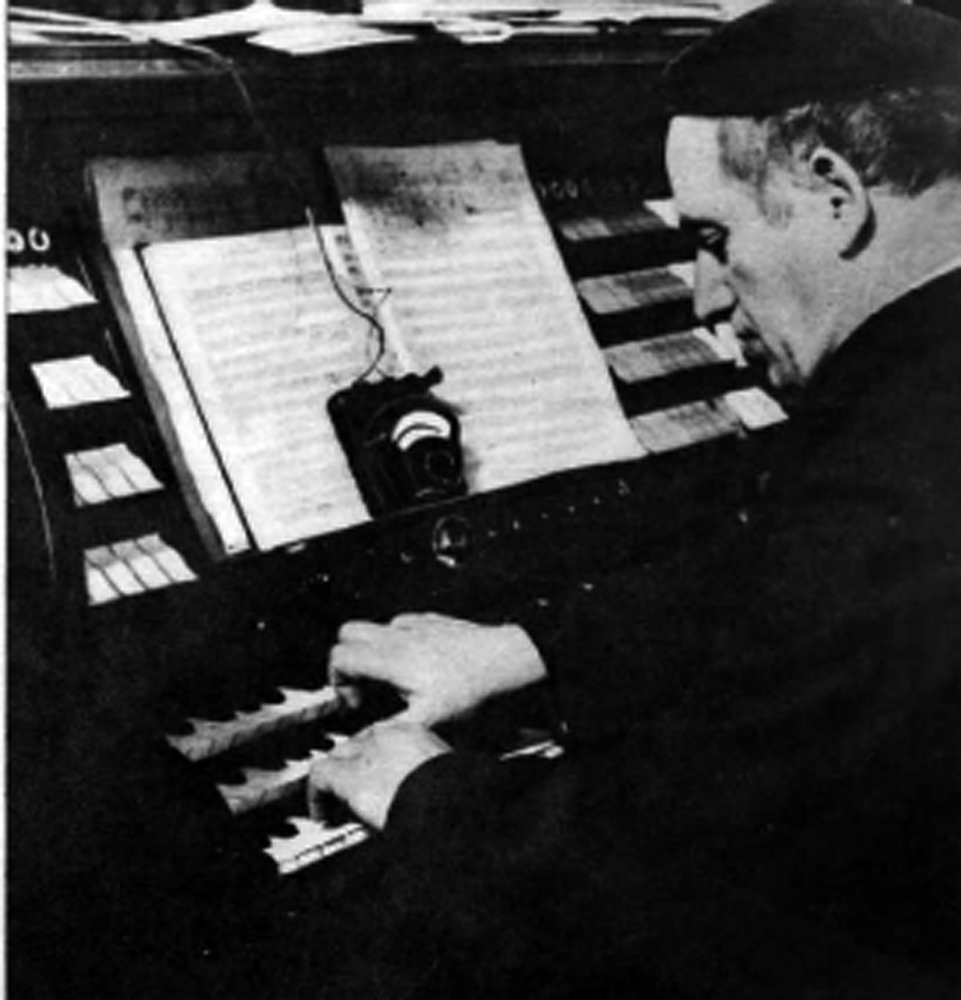
Jörg Mager playing his organ, c. 1938, photographer unknown, PIX Magazine

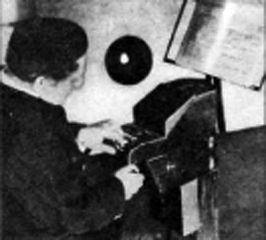
Jörg Mager playing the Gral Bells, c. 1938, photographer unknown, PIX Magazine

== Sources ==
- Davies, Hugh; Donhauser, Peter (2015). "Mager, Jörg". The Grove Dictionary of Musical Instruments. Oxford University Press. ISBN 978-0-19-974339-1.
