= Nikolai Alexandrovich Haller =

Russian nobleman and banker

- Николай Александрович Галлер
- Born: 7 August 1823; Saint Petersburg, Russian Empire
- Died: 21 September 1875 (aged 52)
- Other name: Nikolai Galler
- Occupations: Nobleman and Banker
- Known for: Collector of expensive guns, engravings and stringed instruments
- Spouse: Charlotte H. De Grandseigne

Nikolai Aleksandrovich Haller/Galler (Russian: Николай Александрович Галлер 1823-1875) was a Russian Nobleman who was one of the most powerful bankers of Saint Petersburg in his day, philanthropist, connoisseur and collector of expensive guns, engravings and stringed instruments of Italian masters.

He was known for having amassed a magnificent collection of rare Italian string instruments (including the Bass of Spain cello by Antonio Stradivari), buying directly from Jean-Baptiste Vuillaume and Gand & Bernardel Frères in Paris (in 1870).

== Early life ==
Nikolai Alexandrovich Haller was born on 7 August 1823, in Saint Petersburg, Russia.

== Career ==
He became the director of a bank in Saint Petersburg. He also owned several buildings in the Admiralteysky District, on the island of ‘New Holland’. He was an avid lover of music and amateur cellist. He studied cello with Aleksandr Fyodorovich Meyer of the Mariinsky Theatre orchestra and held chamber music soirées in his house every Saturday. He was also a frequent guest of the Grand Duke Konstantin Nikolayevich of Russia, brother of Tsar Alexander II.

List of seven fine instruments owned by Nikolai Haller from 1870 to 1876: the ‘St Senoch’, ‘Pleeth’ and ‘Bass of Spain’ Antonio Stradivari cellos, the 1708 ‘Carrodus’ Antonio Stradivari violin (which after Haller and David Laurie, belonged to John Tiplady Carrodus, Bernhard Carrodus, Robert George T. Carrodus), the 1742 Guarneri ‘Del Gesù’ (gifted by Haller to Aleksandra Unkovskaya (born Zakharina), now part of the Russian State Collection), the 1678 ‘Joseph Joachim’ Nicolo Amati violin (in 1988, reassessed by Bein & Fushi, as Francesco Rugeri), the 1872 ‘St Nicolas’ Vuillaume violin(gifted by Haller to Sonia Zakharina, Aleksandra's sister) and Carlo Bergonzi tenor viola.

== Personal life ==
Nikolai was married to Charlotte H. De Grandseigne, a French noblewoman of the De Grandseigne dynasty. Nikolai Haller died on 21 September 1875. After his death, his wife sold the collection of rare Italian instruments to David Laurie (the London violin dealer).

According to Laurie's book "Reminiscences of a Fiddle Dealer" c.1900, David Laurie purchased a big collection of rare instruments in Saint Petersburg (in 1876) from a widow of a Russian Nobleman. The name of the Russian Nobleman remained elusive since the late 19th century, until recently, when it was discovered by Gennady Filimonov.

== Quotes ==
Aleksandra Unkovskaya’s memoir contains an account of Haller’s purchase of instruments from Vuillaume:“In the summer Nikolai Aleksandrovich Galler [Haller] went to Paris and brought [bought] from J.B. Vuillaume a whole collection of magnificent violins, violas and cellos of Antonio Stradivari, Nicolò Amati and other famous Italian masters, and a violin by Guarneri ‘del Gesù’. Vuillaume, in memory of such an unprecedented Russian purchase by un seigneur Russe très riche of a whole collection of precious instruments, si prècieux qu’au fond ils n’ont pas de prix, made a violin with his own hands and called it ‘St Nicolas’, and presented it to Nikolai Aleksandrovich. This violin is now my sister Sonya’s, who is also a violinist, but the Guarneri ‘del Gesù’ is mine.” – Alexandra Unkovskaya

"The presence of Haller’s precious collection of musical instruments in the city aroused a new interest in playing stringed instruments, on which many began to learn...Nikolai Aleksandrovich Haller, an educated man, said that while mathematics plays the main role in the construction of stringed instruments, mathematics inspired by a sense of living beauty is at its core."- Alexandra Unkovskaya

"As for the violin made by Vuillaume ‘with his own hands’,it is indeed called the ‘St Nicolas’ and was made in 1872 as one of his Apostles series. In a letter dated 11 September 1872,Vuillaume wrote to Haller: ‘I have received your good letter of the 23rd, which tells me of the preference you have for Stradivarius. So I have therefore finished the instrument, over which I have taken great care, especially for you. As for the few extraordinary instruments I have made, I have given them names in order to distinguish each one. The one intended for you is the St Nicolas. I hope it will have an effect upon your music lovers. I don’t think I have made a better or more complete one. The wood, the work and varnish are all splendid. As for the tone, you will judge for yourself. I hope it will give you as much pleasure in receiving it as I have had in offering it to you. I think it will not suffer in comparison to your magnificent instruments of the great masters!’ The letter is addressed to ‘Nicolas de Haller’, the ‘de’ prefix being used to honor the Russian’s noble lineage. The ‘St Nicolas’ is labelled: ‘Jean Baptiste Vuillaume a Paris, 3 rue Demours Ternes, JBV’. Inscribed on the label are the words Dédié a M. Nicolas de Haller, 1872. Vuillaume even included a very special note along with his signature on the upper back: Exprès pour M. Nicolas de Haller 1872. Based on the ‘Messiah’ Stradivari, the violin was one of the instruments displayed at the 1998 exhibition of Vuillaume works in Paris."

== Notes ==
- On The Trail of a Russian Nobleman by Gennady Filimonov The Strad magazine June 2023 p.20-p.25
- https://www.thestrad.com/lutherie/on-the-trail-of-a-1708-stradivari-jt-carrodus-and-a-mystery-violin/16402.article On the trail of a 1708 Stradivari: J.T. Carrodus and a mystery violin by Gennady Filimonov June 2023 The STRAD magazine
- The Reminiscences of a Fiddle Dealer by David Laurie
- Воспоминания : репринт издания журнала "Вестник теософии", 1917 г. | Memoirs: reprint of the journal "Bulletin of Theosophy", 1917.
