= Andrea Guarneri =

Italian luthier (1626–1698)

- Born: 1626; Casalbuttano, Cremona
- Died: 7 December 1698 (aged 71–72); Cremona
- Education: Nicola Amati
- Known for: Luthier, founder of Casa Guarneri (House of Guarneri), musician
- Notable work: Conte Vitale, ex-Landau; Viola (1676)
- Style: Amati style
- Movement: Cremonese school
- Spouse: Anna Maria Orcelli (m. 1652)
- Children: 4, including Pietro and Giuseppe

Andrea Guarneri (b.1626, in Casalbuttano; d.1698, in Cremona) was an Italian luthier, musician and founder of the Casa Guarneri. He is the most important student of Nicola Amati and grandfather of one of the best luthiers, Bartolomeo Giuseppe Guarneri, del Gesù.

== Biography ==
Thought to be born in 1626 to Bartolomo Guarneri in the parish of Cremona, Italy, very little is known about Andrea Guarneri's ancestors. There are records of a wood-carver by the name of Giovanni Battista Guerine, which may have been an alternative spelling of Guarneri, who lived near the residence of Nicolò Amati in Cremona in 1632, and it is possible that Andrea Guarneri was a relation of Guerine. In 1652, while still living in the Amati household, Andrea married Anna Maria Orcelli, daughter of Orazio Orcelli. The young Guarneri family finally left the Amati household in 1654, with Andrea probably removing himself from Amati's workshop and patronage at that time. They moved to the house of Guarneri's father-in-law, the Casa Orcelli, which eventually became the Casa Guarneri. Anna Maria soon bore a daughter, Angela Teresa, followed just over a year later by a son, Pietro Giovanni, who was eventually to carry on his father's violin making. In 1655 we have the first proof that Andrea had definitively left Amati's workshop, in the form of a label in a violin dated 1655, which says "ex Allumnis Nicolai Amati". In all previous labels "Alumnus" was written without the prefix "ex". However, it is thought that even quite some time after both Andrea Guarneri and Francesco Ruggieri left Amati's workshop they occasionally made entire instruments for their former master, which bear the Amati label.

By the mid-1660s Andrea and Anna Maria had had two more sons, Eusebio Amati, born in 1658, and Giovanni Battista in 1666. Despite their third son Eusebio's namesake, and probably his god-parent, he was the only son not to follow in his father's footsteps as a violin maker. No further information on Eusebio is available. By evidence in the workmanship of his violins, it is thought that by 1670 or 1675 at least his eldest son Pietro Giovanni (later known as Pietro of Mantua), was making his presence known in the Guarneri workshop. Some of the instruments become lighter, and show a Stradivarian influence. Eventually entire instruments appear to be made by Pietro Giovanni's hand, though they contain the original Andrea Guarneri label. But the cooperation between father and son was short-lived. In 1679, at the age of 24 Pietro's name appears for the last time in the census at his father's house. He soon moved to Mantua and became successful in his own right.

However, soon enough Andrea's youngest son joined his father at the workbench. Giuseppe Giovanni Battista is commonly known in the violin trade as Joseph Guarnerius, filius Andreæ. Probably between the first and third sons were other apprentices and assistants whose identities are lost, though their work is sometimes clearly distinguishable. Andrea himself clearly sought to distinguish between the work of him and his family from that of other workers in his workshop by inserting labels saying Sotto la disciplina (Under the discipline of...). Andrea Guarneri was the first master to make this distinction; the Amatis never did this, though later Stradivari adopted this idea. Some known assistants who were registered in the Guarneri household and later became known luthiers include Giacomo Gennaro (1641–1646) and Paolo Grancino.

The exact date of the beginning Giuseppe's apprenticeship is unknown, but evidence of his work begin to be recognizable in Guarneri instruments beginning in 1680, and his influence continued to increase towards the end of his father's career, surpassing that of his father by 1685. Instruments coming out of the Guarneri workshop also continue to show the inspiration of Andrea's eldest son, though he was living in Mantua. Probably the younger looked up to the elder and eagerly copied some of his ideas especially in the form of the outline and cut of the f-holes.

The workshop of Andrea Guarneri was one of those who profited from the demand for less expensive instruments that still had the prestigious "Cremonese" designation. Occasionally, however, specific patronage afforded him the opportunity to rise to a higher level, of which he was quite clearly capable. The surviving examples of the workshop only total about 250 instruments with only four violas and fourteen violoncelli.

In his will Andrea Guarneri recorded for posterity the bitterness he felt toward his elder son Pietro for having left the family and moving to Mantua, and for his ingratitude to them even before that. For this he is punished by receiving a reduced inheritance and is called to account for various articles he had taken with him from the family home and workshop. He died on 7 December 1698 in Cremona and was buried in the family crypt of his mother in Basilica di San Domenico.

== Instruments ==
The earliest Andrea Guarneri violins unsurprisingly closely resembled the Amati style with rounded 'bouts and slender corners whose looser curves end with a slight flat. It appears that he simply continued to use the same moulds that he had in his master's workshop. The arching height is moderate with graceful fluting and the f-holes are quite Amatian, though with the upper eyes tending to be slightly too close together. As the years went on more and more characteristic features of Guarneri's work distinguished themselves. His arching tends toward fullness, and the mitres of his purfling often turning rather abruptly at the corners. The scroll was generally relatively small, without clearly defined chamfers and with shallower volutes than was typical of his teacher. He left the back plate quite thick in the centre, thinning it towards the edges, and the table of consistent thickness, though there seems to be no desire to obtain perfect accuracy in the thickening. The maple used seems to be of local origin and often fairly plain figure.

Later in his life the corners become shorter and blunter, edges heavier, and arching more pinched which became somewhat irregularly formed at times with exaggerated fluting. The f-holes tend to stand more upright, cut generously with slightly hollowed wings. The Scrolls when made by Andrea Guarneri were generally neat, but when assisted by Giuseppe Filius, one may notice that they were more youthful not necessarily more finely finished.

Throughout his career Guarneri used a high quality oil varnish, the recipe of which was probably learned from his master Nicolò Amati, though evidence of the use of dryers is sometimes apparent specially thus providing a Brescian hue to some of the instruments of Casa Guarneri which was never done by Amati. The color varies from chestnut brown, orange brown, to brown-red.

Probably his most famous instrument is the 41.5 cm (16.3 in) Conte Vitale viola of 1676. It is one of the most copied viola patterns today, though few modern makers chose to copy its distinctively deep fluting. The modeling of the instrument incorporates much that he learned from the Amatis, yet exhibits a characteristic Guarneri robustness. There is a harmony between model, f-hole placement, head and arching that is rarely duplicated.

Andrea Guarneri also pioneered a smaller sized violoncello, which evolved over the course of his lifetime from the Amati form and style, though credit may also be due to his acquaintance and competitor, Francesco Ruggieri who made many 'celli in the same period.

== Notable players and owners ==
- Emmy Verhey, a Dutch violinist, has a 1676 violin.
- Kenneth Rose, an American violinist, had a 1684 violin.
- Daishin Kashimoto, a Japanese violinist, plays a 1674 violin.
- William Hagen, an American violinist, plays a 1675 violin.
- David Laurie, a well-known British collector, had 1661 violin.
- Adelina Patti, a prominent opera singer, and Anton Hegner, a virtuoso cellist, at different times both owned a 1679 cello.
- Johannes Moser, a German/Canadian cellist, had a 1694 cello.
- Judith Stapf, a German violinist, plays a 1663 violin.
- Paul Katz, cellist of the Cleveland Quartet, plays a 1669 Andrea Guarneri cello.
- David Soyer, founding cellist with the Guarneri Quartet played a 1669 Andrea Guaneri cello.
- Amit Peled, virtuoso cellist and professor at the Peabody Institute, plays a 1689 cello.
- Warren Reid, an Australian violinist, has a violin estimated 1680-1690 (Hills cert. 1919) page 154.
- Liana Issakadze, a Georgian violin soloist who studied with David Oistrakh, plays a fine example estimated 1675–1680.
- Glenn Dicterow, former concert master of New York Philharmonic, has a violin 1657.
- Rainer Kussmaul, a German violinist, former concert master of the Berlin Philharmonic Orchestra, had a violin estimated 1675–1680 (R. Baumgartner cert. 1990)
