= Ex-Primrose Guarneri =

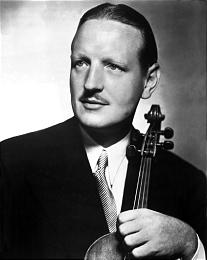
William Primrose

The "ex-Primrose" Guarneri is an antique viola named after the viola player William Primrose who purchased it in 1954. This late 17th-century instrument is one of seven known Guarneri family violas.

== Description ==
The back of the viola is Italian maple and the front is open-grained spruce. It has a deep golden varnish with a subtle orange tint. It bears an original label of Andrea Guarneri who died in 1698, but experts believe that they can recognise the workmanship of his son Giuseppe. The son (also known as Joseph Guarneri 'filius Andrea') showed a characteristic style when making sound holes, for example.

== History ==
The viola was made in Cremona, Italy in 1697. At that time violas came in two sizes, tenor and alto. Alto violas such as the ex-Primrose have since become the standard voicing.

The early owners of the instrument are not documented. It appeared in England in the 19th century and was purchased by the Earl of Harrington in 1874. The Earl had a collection of instruments at his home Elvaston Castle. The viola was acquired by the Rembert Wurlitzer Company in the 1950s and came to Primrose's attention. It became his solo instrument. The instrument is not known to have been owned by a professional violist before Primrose. In 1975 or 1978 Primrose sold the Guarneri viola to Gary Vandosdale, a former student. It was then sold in 1978 to Ulrich Fritze, who played the viola during his 30-year tenure as principal violist of the Berlin Philharmonic. The viola was sold in 2012 by Tarisio "for over $4 million, the highest price paid for a Guarneri family instrument at auction and the highest publicly recorded price for a viola of any type".
