= Antonio Stradivari =

Italian luthier (1644–1737)

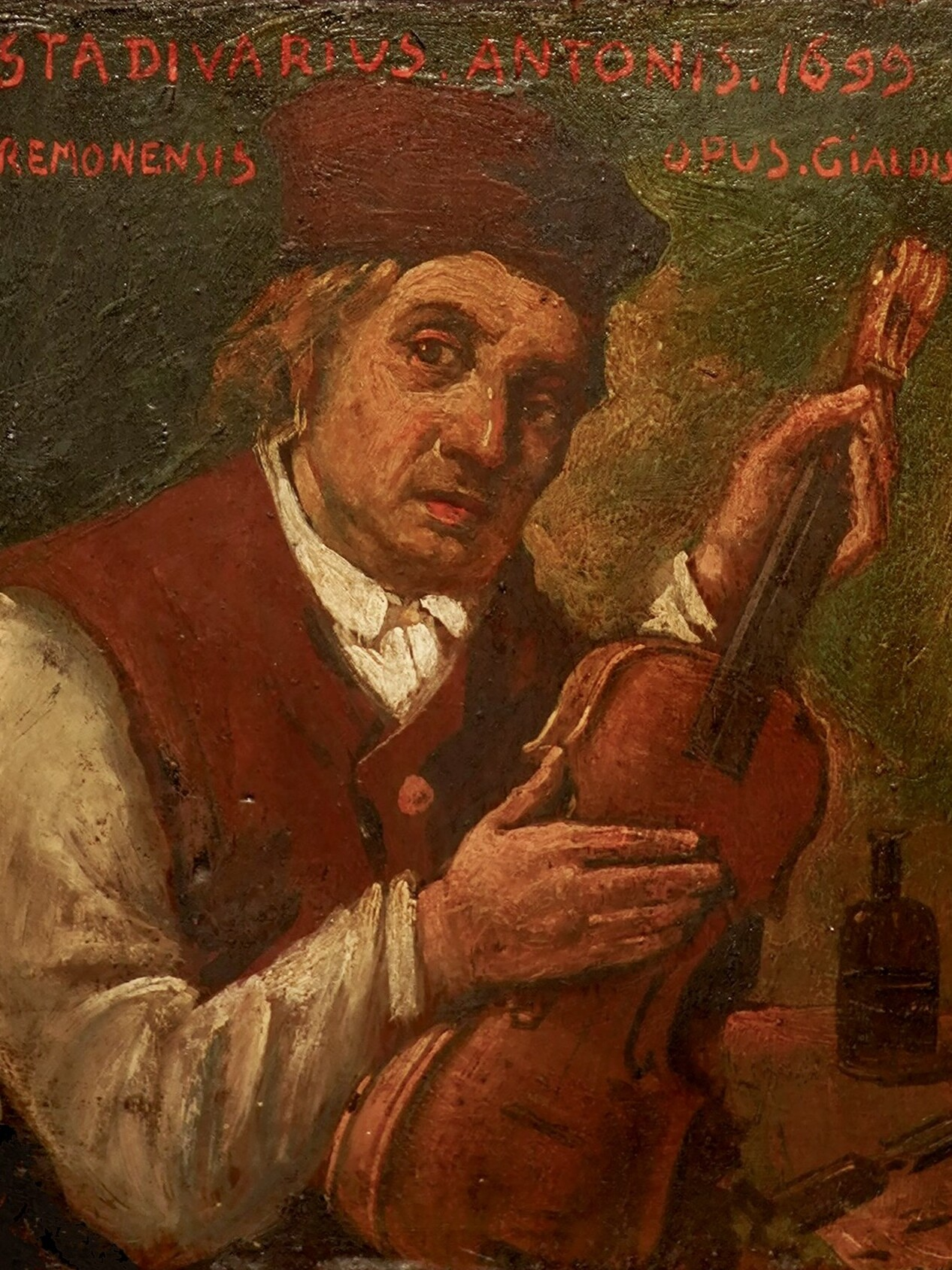
- 1712 copy of an unauthenticated portrait, possibly after a 1691 original
- Born: Antonius Stradivarius c. 1644; Cremona, Duchy of Milan
- Died: 18 December 1737 (aged 92–93); Cremona, Duchy of Milan
- Resting place: Church of San Domenico
- Education: Nicola Amati; Francesco Rugeri
- Known for: Luthier
- Notable work: ex-Back (c. 1666); Cipriani Potter (1683); Stauffer; ex-Cristiani (cello; 1700); Soil (1714); Alard–Baron Knoop (1715); Messiah-Salabue (1716); Lady Blunt (1721)
- Style: Stradivarius style; Rugeri style; Amati style
- Movement: Cremonese school
- Spouses: Francesca Ferraboschi (m. 1667; died 1698) Antonia Maria Zambelli (m. 1699)
- Children: 11
- Memorials: 19189 Stradivari (Asteroid)

Antonio Stradivari (/ˌstrædɪˈvɑːri/, also US: /-ˈvɛəri/, Italian: [anˈtɔːnjo stradiˈvaːri]; c. 1644 – 18 December 1737) was an Italian luthier and a craftsman of string instruments such as violins, cellos, guitars, violas and harps. The Latinized form of his surname, Stradivarius, as well as the colloquial Strad are terms often used to refer to his instruments. It is estimated that Stradivari produced 1,116 instruments, of which 960 were violins. Around 650 instruments survive, including 450 to 512 violins. His instruments are considered some of the finest ever made, and are extremely valuable collector's items.

== Early life ==
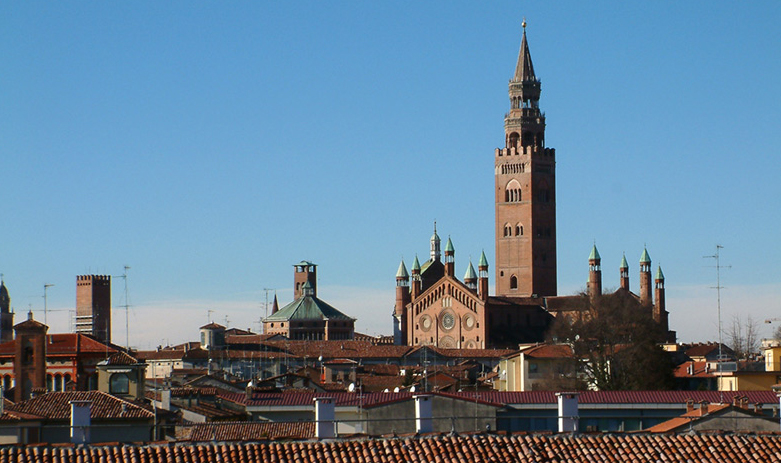
Panorama of Cremona, with the Torrazzo di Cremona prominent

Antonio Stradivari's birthdate, presumably between 1644 and 1649, has been debated amongst historians due to the numerous inconsistencies in the evidence of the latter. The 1668 and 1678 censuses report him actually growing younger, a fact explained by the probable loss of statistics from 1647 to 1649, when renewed belligerency between France's Modenese and Spain's Milanese proxies led to a flow of refugees that included Stradivari's mother.

Stradivari's ancestry consisted of notable citizens of Cremona, dating back to at least the 12th or 13th century. The earliest mention of the family name, or a variation upon it, is in a land grant dating from 1188. The origin of the name itself has several possible explanations; some sources say it is the plural of stradivare, essentially meaning "toll-man" in Lombard, while others say that the form de Strataverta derives from strada averta, which in Cremonese dialect means "open road".

Antonio's parents were Alessandro Stradivari, son of Giulio Cesare Stradivari, and Anna Moroni, daughter of Leonardo Moroni. They married on 30 August 1622, and had at least three children between 1623 and 1628: Giuseppe Giulio Cesare, Carlo Felice, and Giovanni Battista. The baptismal records of the parish of S. Prospero then stop, and it is unknown whether they had any children from 1628 to 1644. This gap in the records may be due to the family leaving Cremona in response to war, famine, and plague in the city from 1628 to 1630, or the records may have been lost due to clerical reforms imposed by Joseph II of Austria in 1788. The latter explanation is supported by the word Cremonensis (of Cremona) on many of Stradivari's labels, which suggests that he was born in the city instead of merely moving back there to work. Antonio was born in 1644, a fact deducible from later violins. However, there are no records or information available on his early childhood, and the first evidence of his presence in Cremona is the label of his oldest surviving violin from 1666.

Stradivari likely began an apprenticeship with Nicola Amati between the ages of 12 and 14, although a minor debate surrounds this fact. One of the few pieces of evidence supporting this is the label of his 1666 violin, which reads, Alumnus Nicolai Amati, faciebat anno 1666. However, Stradivari did not repeatedly put Amati's name on his labels, unlike many of Amati's other students. Stradivari's early violins actually bear less resemblance to Amati's than his later instruments do. M. Chanot-Chardon, a well-known French luthier, asserted that his father had a label of Stradivari's stating, "Made at the age of thirteen, in the workshop of Nicolò Amati". This label has never been found or confirmed. Amati would also have been a logical choice for Antonio's parents, as he represented an old family of violin makers in Cremona, and was far superior to most other luthiers in Italy.

The utilization of a small dorsal pin or small hole, invariably used not just by Nicolò Amati but all of his recognized pupils — but not used by Antonio Stradivari — adds further evidence that Stradivari may not have learnt his craft from Amati. This pin or hole was fundamental in the graduation of the thickness of the plates and was a technique passed on through generations of pupils of the Amati. This dorsal pin is also not found in any of the instruments of the Rugeri family, suggesting Antonio Stradivari may have actually learnt his craft from Francesco Rugeri, both of them having been influenced by Amati. W. E. Hill & Sons concede that they fail to find the hand of Stradivari in any of Nicola Amati's work, although the unmistakable hands of Andrea Guarneri and Francesco Rugeri are evident.

An alternative theory is that Stradivari started out as a woodworker: the house he lived in from 1667 to 1680 was owned by Francesco Pescaroli, a woodcarver and inlayer. Stradivari may even have been employed to decorate some of Amati's instruments, without being a true apprentice. This theory is supported by some of Stradivari's later violins, which have elaborate decorations and purfling.

Assuming that Stradivari was a student of Amati, he would have begun his apprenticeship in 1656–58 and produced his first decent instruments in 1660, at the age of 16. His first labels were printed from 1660 to 1665, which indicates that his work had sufficient quality to be offered directly to his patrons. However, he probably stayed in Amati's workshop until about 1684, using his master's reputation as a launching point for his career.

== Career ==
=== Early career ===
Stradivari probably developed his own style slowly. Some of his early violins were smaller, with notable exception to this is the 1679 Hellier violin, which had much larger proportions. Stradivari's early (pre-1684) violins are in strong contrast to Amati's instruments from the same time period; Stradivari's have a stronger build; less rounded curves, with the purfling set farther in.

By 1680, Stradivari had acquired at least a small, yet growing, reputation. In 1682, a Venetian banker ordered a complete set of instruments, which he planned to present to King James II of England. The fate of these instruments is unknown. Cosimo III de' Medici bought another five years later. Amati died in 1684, an event followed by a noticeable increase in Stradivari's production. The years 1684 and 1685 also marked an important development in his style—the dimensions he used generally increased, and his instruments were more in the style of Amati's work of the 1640s and 1650s. Stradivari's instruments underwent no major change in the next five years, although in 1688 he began cutting a more distinct bevel and began outlining the heads of instruments in black, a quite original improvement.

Stradivari's relatively early success in his career may have allowed him to use a more experimental approach to violin building. In fact, Stradivari's early career is marked by wide experimentation, and his instruments during this period are generally considered of a lesser quality than his later work. However, the precision with which he carved the heads and inserted the purfling quickly marked him as one of the most dextrous craftsmen in the world, a prime example of this being the 1690 "Tuscan" violin. Pre-1690 instruments are sometimes termed "Amatisé" but this is not completely accurate; it is largely because Stradivari created many more instruments later on that people try to connect his early work with Amati's style.

By 1680 Stradivari moved to No. 1 Piazza Roma (formerly No. 2 Piazza San Domenico). The house was just doors away from those of several other violin-making families of Cremona, including the Amatis and Guarneris. Stradivari probably worked in the loft and attic, and he lived in this house for the rest of his life.

=== "Golden" period and later years ===
In the early 1690s, Stradivari made a pronounced departure from this earlier style of instrument-making, changing two key elements of his instruments. First, he began to make violins with a larger pattern than previous instruments; these larger violins are usually known as "Long Strads". He also switched to using a darker, richer varnish, as opposed to a yellower varnish similar to that used by Amati. He continued to use this pattern until 1698, with few exceptions. Between 1698 and 1700, he abandoned the Long Strad model and returned to a slightly shorter model, which he used until his death. The period from 1700 to 1725 is often termed the "Golden Period" of his production. Instruments made during this time are usually considered of a higher quality than his earlier instruments. These instruments also fetch much higher prices than his other instruments and are especially prized by collectors. Late-period instruments made from the late 1720s until his death in 1737 show signs of Stradivari's advancing age. These late instruments may be a bit less beautiful than the Golden Period instruments, but many nonetheless possess a fine tone. Heavier and looser craftsmanship of the late Stradivari output can be seen in the 1734 'Habeneck'.

== Personal life ==
=== First marriage ===
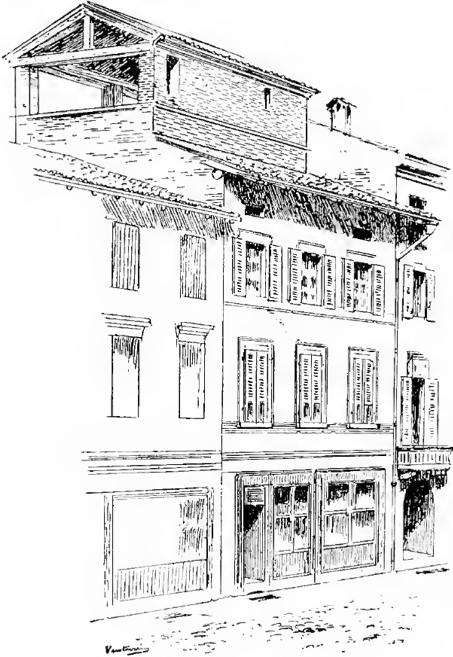
Antonio Stradivari's second house, at No. 2 Piazza San Domenico

Stradivari married his first wife, Francesca Ferraboschi, on 4 July 1667. A clue to how they would have met lies in the 1659 Easter census, which lists the Ferraboschi family four houses away from the Amati residence. Francesca was the young widow of the burgher Giacomo Capra, with whom she had two children. Francesca's brother had shot Giacomo with a crossbow on the Piazza Garibaldi (formerly the Piazza Santa Agata) in 1664. He was later exiled, though allowed to return to Cremona many years later. After their marriage, Stradivari moved into a house known as the Casa del Pescatore, or the Casa Nuziale, in his wife's parish. The couple had a daughter, Giulia Maria, three to four months later. They remained in the house until 1680, during which time they had five more children, starting with an infant son who lived for only a week, and then Francesco, Catterina, Alessandro, and Omobono Stradivari.

Stradivari purchased a house now known as No. 1 Piazza Roma (formerly No. 2 Piazza San Domenico) around 1680 for the sum of 7000 lire, 2000 of which he paid at the time of the purchase. The totality of the house was paid for by 1684. The residence was just doors away from those of several other violin-making families of Cremona, including the Amatis and Guarneris. Stradivari probably worked in the loft and attic, and he stayed in this house for the rest of his life.

Stradivari's wife Francesca died on 20 May 1698, and received an elaborate funeral five days later.

=== Second marriage ===
Stradivari married his second wife, Antonia Maria Zambelli, on 24 August 1699. She was 35 at the time of the marriage. They had five children from 1700 to 1708—Francesca Maria, Giovanni Battista Giuseppe, Giovanni Battista Martino, Giuseppe Antonio, and Paolo.

Immediate family of Antonio Stradivari

Giulio Cesare Stradivari	Doralice Milani m. 1600	Leonardo Moroni
Alessandro Stradivari b. 1602	Anna Moroni m. 1622
Giuseppe Giulio Cesare b. 1623	Carlo Felice b. 1626	Giovanni Battista b. 1628	Antonio Stradivari c. 1644–1737	Francesca Ferraboschi; 1640–1698 m. 1667	Antonia Maria Zambelli c. 1664–1737 m. 1699
Giulia Maria c. 1667–	Francesco; 1670–1670	Francesco; 1671–1743	Catterina Annunciata; 1674–1748	Alessandro Giuseppe; 1677–1732	Omobono Stradivari; 1679–1742	Francesca Maria; 1700–1720	Giovanni Battista Giuseppe; 1701–1702	Giovanni Battista Martino; 1703–1727	Giuseppe Antonio; 1704–1781	Paolo; 1708–1776

== Death ==
Stradivari died in Cremona on 18 December 1737, aged 93, after roughly 75 years of crafting instruments. He is buried in the Church of San Domenico. The tomb was acquired eight years prior to his death, having been bought from a Cremonese family, substituting his name for theirs in the tombstone.

=== Will ===
Stradivari generated substantial wealth in his lifetime. His will, dated 1729, counted eight living heirs, including his wife. Zambelli was left with her clothing, bed linens, household items, and half of her jewelry. Antonia would become the responsibility of his two eldest sons. Annunciata Caterina was left her jewelry, clothing, linens, and income on loans. Paolo, the youngest child, would get six finished violins—valued at 1,000 lire—as well as some household effects and cash. Three other children who had joined religious orders were left with their share of inheritance: Maria, a nun, would get an annuity; Alessandro, a priest, would get fixed income on a home mortgage loan; and Giuseppe, another priest, would get some income on half a share from a pastry shop. There were also annual payments to his two sons of 150 and 300 lire each and 170 lire for Annunciata and 100 for Francesca.

His remaining two sons from his first marriage had both worked in the family shop. Omobono, who had left the dwelling aged eighteen in search of new employment possibilities in Naples, would inherit six violins, and Francesco, who was named his father's successor, would inherit the rest of the estate, including all of the tools, stencils, finished violins, patterns, and—ostensibly—his father's reputation. In 1733, he had bought his youngest son a partnership in a local textile firm for the large amount of 25,000 lire.

== Stradivari and the Cremonese violin making school ==
=== Influence in the 18th century ===
The Stradivari parish, San Matteo, and the Amati parish, San Faustino, comprised the center of Cremonese violin making. They exerted influence on one another's shape, varnish and sound of instruments, but also on many of their contemporaries'; they defined violin making standards for the next 300 years.

Even at the beginning of the 18th century, Stradivari's influence could be seen not only in the work of Cremonese makers, but also international ones, such as Barak Norman's, one of the first important British makers. In the 1720s Daniel Parker, a very important British luthier, produced fine violins after Stradivari's work selling anywhere from £30,000 to £60,000 in recent auctions. Parker based his best instruments on Stradivari's "long pattern", having the opportunity to study one or more of the instruments. Well into the 19th century, Jean-Baptiste Vuillaume, the leading French luthier of his time, also made many important copies of Strads and Guarneris.

In the 18th century, Cremonese luthiers were the suppliers and local players on the demand side. After Stradivari's death, this drastically changed. Although the Cremonese luthiers remained the suppliers, the demand side now consisted mainly of collectors, researchers, imitators, profiteers, and speculators. Many local players could no longer afford the sought-out instruments and most of the purchased instruments would be hidden in private collections, put in museums, or simply put back in their cases, hoping that they would gain value over time. This is when the Stradivari "fever" really took off. The violin collector Count Ignazio Alessandro Cozio di Salabue, Vuillaume, and later Tarisio Auctions have all contributed to this frenzy that would extend well into the 21st century. Also, most of the other major Cremonese luthiers died soon after Stradivari, putting an end to the golden period of Cremona's violin making, which lasted more than 150 years, starting with the Amatis and ending with the Cerutis.

The Cremonese maker Vincenzo Rugeri (1663–1719), while staying true to the Grand Amati Pattern by Nicolo Amati, was influenced by Stradivari in that he adopted a somewhat lower arch consistent with Stradivarian ideals.

Members of the Gagliano family such as Gennaro and Nicolo made excellent copies of the instruments in the 1740s, though the only similarity to Stradivari's instruments was the execution of the form and arching as well as consistently fine and detailed varnish. Nicolo would usually use the forma B model for his cellos and as the quality of the output steadily declined within the family, the Stradivari models were almost abandoned in Naples.

Having acquired many Strads from Paolo Stradivari, Count Cozio commissioned Giovanni Battista Guadagnini to make some replicas of the instruments. Although many features of Strads are present in the copies, they still remain heavily influenced by Guadagnini's workshop principles and represent well the maker's Turin period.

Vincenzo Panormo was also one of the many luthiers who based many of his violins on Strads. He learned about them in Paris between 1779 and 1789 when he worked closely with Léopold Renaudin, another one of Strad's followers. Stradivari's influence could also be seen in Spain with the outstanding work of José Contreras of Granada and Madrid. Having the privilege to be exposed to Stradivari's instruments through the Spanish court, he was experienced enough to replace the scroll of a 1717 Stradivari cello and possibly even make its back and ribs. He had a great ability to imitate the original varnish and intricacy of the instrument.

=== Influence in the 19th and 20th century ===
The 19th century was not as eventful in comparison to the previous centuries. Some of the most important luthiers from this part of history include Giovanni Rota, as well as the two non-Italian makers François Chanot in France and the artist, inventor and musician William Sidney Mount in the US, who both created experimental violins.

The 20th century was the so-called rebirth of Cremonese making, when luthiers such as Giuseppe Antonio Rocca, Giovanni Battista Morassi, Beltrami, and the Antoniazzi family emerged from a seemingly uneventful and experimental period. These makers, sometimes basing their early violins on Strads, would later on make their own models and would inspire each other's work.

The Cremonese violin-making school

Andrea Amati c. 1505–1577
Antonio Amati c. 1537–1607	Girolamo Amati; 1561–1630
Nicola Amati; 1596–1684
Jacob Stainer c. 1618–1683	Antonio Stradivari; 1644–1737	Girolamo Amati II; 1649–1740	Andrea Guarneri; 1626–1698
F. Stradivari; 1671–1743	O. Stradivari; 1679–1742	Pietro Guarneri; 1655–1720	Giuseppe Guarneri; 1666–c. 1739/40
Giuseppe Guarneri "del Gesu"; 1698–1744	Pietro Guarneri "de Venice"; 1695–1762

- solid lines = Pere-Fils (father to son)
- dashed lines = Maitre-Eleve (master to student)

=== Stradivari and his sons ===
Even though Antonio had a very long working life, it is impossible for him to have crafted more than 1,000 instruments entirely by himself, meaning that his sons, Francesco and Omobono, as well as possibly a third son, must have been working on and off in his shop. It is known that having left the workshop at eighteen, Omobono made a few instruments on his own, such as the 'Blagrove' and another violin dating from 1732. On his side, Francesco made very few violins independently, such as the 1742 'Salabue' and 'Oliveira', spending his lifetime in his father's shop. This was one of the main reasons that Francesco had a large part in Antonio's will, and Omobono a lesser one. One of the major differences between Antonio and his sons' craftsmanship was the quality of the purfling on their instruments, which in the case of Francesco and Omobono has been referred to as "startlingly poor".

John Dilworth further writes:

"Only a handful of instruments are reliably attributed to Francesco alone. ... [There are only] two authentic labels known: 'Franciscus Stradivarius Cremonensis / Filius Antonii faciebat Anno 1742' ... Notably it omits the A+S stamp that occurs on Antonio's labels. Another label states 'Sotto la Disciplina d'Antonio / Stradivari F. in Cremona 1737'. This is of course the year of his father's death, and the phrase 'sotto la disciplina' ('under the discipline'), although it appears in a few other instruments, may here be a particular sign of his respect."

== Stradivarius instruments ==
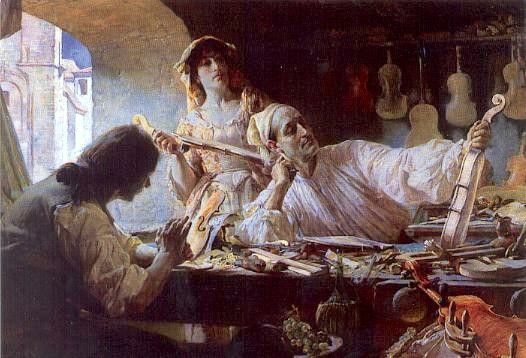
Antonio Stradivari, by Edgar Bundy, 1893: a romanticized image of a craftsman-hero

The Hills Violin Shop estimates that Stradivari produced 1,116 instruments, of which 960 were violins. It is also estimated that around 650 of these instruments survive, including 450 to 512 violins.

Stradivari's instruments are regarded as among the finest bowed stringed instruments ever created, are highly prized, and are still played by professionals today. His violins are desired more than those of any other luthier except his contemporary, Giuseppe Guarneri del Gesù, who commands a similar respect among violinists. However, neither blind listening tests nor acoustic analysis have ever demonstrated that Stradivarius instruments are better than other high-quality instruments or even reliably distinguishable from them.

While the usual label for a Stradivarius instrument, whether genuine or false, uses the traditional Latin inscription, after the McKinley Tariff Act of 1890, copies were also inscribed with the country of origin. Since thousands of instruments are based on Stradivari's models and bear the same name as his models, many unwary people are deceived into purchasing forged Stradivarius instruments, which can be avoided by authenticating the instrument.

Some violinists and cellists use Stradivari instruments in their work. Yo-Yo Ma uses the Davidov Stradivarius, Julian Lloyd Webber employs the Barjansky Stradivarius, and, until his death in 2007, Mstislav Rostropovich played on the Duport Stradivarius. The Soil of 1714 is owned by virtuoso Itzhak Perlman. The Countess Polignac is currently played by Gil Shaham. The Vienna Philharmonic uses several Stradivari instruments that were purchased by Austria's central bank Österreichische Nationalbank and other sponsors: Chaconne, 1725; ex-Hämmerle, 1709; ex-Smith-Quersin, 1714; ex-Arnold Rosé, ex-Viotti, 1718; and ex-Halphen, 1727. Viktoria Mullova owns and plays the Jules Falk. Joshua Bell owns and plays the Gibson ex-Huberman.

The London sales of The Mendelssohn at £902,000 ($1,776,940) in 1990 and The Kreutzer for £947,500 in 1998 constitute two top-selling Stradivari. A record price paid at a public auction for a Stradivari was $2,032,000 for the Lady Tennant at Christie's in New York, April 2005. On 16 May 2006, Christie's auctioned Stradivari's 1707 Hammer for a new record of US$3,544,000. On 2 April 2007, Christie's sold a Stradivari violin, the 1729 Solomon, Ex-Lambert, for more than $2.7 million to an anonymous bidder in the auction house's fine musical instruments sale. Its price, US$2,728,000 including Christie's commission, far outdid its estimated value: $1 million to $1.5 million. On 14 October 2010, a 1697 Stradivari violin known as "The Molitor" was sold online by Tarisio Auctions for a world-record price of $3,600,000 to violinist Anne Akiko Meyers: at the time its price was the highest for any musical instrument sold at auction. On 21 June 2011, the Lady Blunt Stradivarius, a 1721 violin, was auctioned by Tarisio to an anonymous bidder for almost £10 million, with all proceeds going to help the victims of the 2011 Tōhoku earthquake and tsunami. This was over four times the previous auction record for a Stradivari violin. The c. 1705 Baron von der Leyen Strad was auctioned by Tarisio on 26 April 2012, for $2.6 million.

Publicly displayed collections of Stradivari instruments are those of:

- the Library of Congress with three violins, a viola, and a cello
- the Spanish royal collection with five instruments (an undecorated cello plus a quartet of decorated instruments: two violins, the Spanish I and II, the Spanish Court cello, and the Spanish Court viola) exhibited at the Royal Palace of Madrid (Palacio Real de Madrid)
- London's Royal Academy of Music (Royal Academy of Music Museum) with several instruments by Antonio Stradivari, including the Joachim (1698), Rutson (1694), the Crespi (1699), Viotti ex-Bruce (1709), Kustendyke (1699), Maurin (1718) and the Ex Back (1666) violins, Ex Kux (1714), and the Archinto (1696) violas, the Marquis de Corberon (1726) and the Markevitch (1709) celli.
- the Musée de la musique in Paris displays several Stradivari instruments that formerly belonged to the Paris Conservatory.

The collection of the New Jersey Symphony Orchestra had the largest number of Stradivari in its string section, purchased in 2003 from the collection of Herbert R. Axelrod, until it decided to sell them in 2007. A collection assembled by Rodman Wanamaker in the 1920s contained as many as 65 stringed instruments by such masters as Stradivari, Gofriller, Baptiste and Giuseppe Guarneri. Included was The Swan, the last violin made by Stradivari, and soloist instrument of the great Cuban 19th-century virtuoso Joseph White. The collection, known as The Cappella, was used in concerts with the Philadelphia Orchestra and Leopold Stokowski before being dispersed after Wanamaker's death. The Vienna Philharmonic uses four violins and one cello. The Metropolitan Museum of Art has three Stradivari violins dated 1693, 1694 and 1717. The National Music Museum, in Vermillion, South Dakota, has in its collection one of two known Stradivari guitars, one of eleven known violas da gamba, later modified into a cello form, one of two known choral mandolins, and one of six Stradivari violins that still retain their original neck. In the interests of conservation, the Messiah Stradivarius violin—on display in the Ashmolean Museum in Oxford, England—has not been played at all in recent years.
