= Omobono Stradivari =

Italian violin maker (1679 - 1742)

Omobono Stradivari (November 14, 1679 – June 8, 1742) was a violin maker and the sixth child of Antonio Stradivari.

== Biography ==
Omobono Stradivari was born on 14 November 1679 to Antonio Stradivari and his first wife Francesca Ferraboschi in Cremona, Italy. Little is known about his early life except that his family was living at a house known as Casa del Pescatore in the Parish of Saint Agata. Just one year after Omobono was born, the family sold the Casa del Pescatore for the respectable sum of 7,000 Imperial Lire, and relocated to the famous home of Antonio Stradivari, Casa Nuziale, which is now No. 1 Piazza Roma, Cremona. When he was 19, his mother died and his father Antonio organized an elaborate funeral, showing that the Stradivaris were already quite prosperous. Antonio quickly remarried, this time to Antonia Zambelli, and had five more children.

While it is probable that Omobono started working in his father's workshop from a young age, as was the practice of the day, there is very little work that can be definitively traced to him. Antonio Stradivari is well known not only for his high productivity, but also for his use of templates and a highly finished product, eliminating all tool marks that could be used to deduce the identity of the workman. Omobono is supposed to have been chiefly occupied with repairing. On works that are attributable to him, he shows clumsy workmanship, except on the scroll, suggesting that if his father employed a division of labour in his workshop, perhaps Omobono was assigned the scrolls. Besides the decay in workmanship, Omobono's instruments show little other departure from the design of his father except that he tended to point the mitres of his purfling outward, away from the Cs.

After his father's death in 1737, Omobono stopped his production of instruments, and receded into obscurity.

Immediate family of Antonio Stradivari

Giulio Cesare Stradivari | Doralice Milani m. 1600 | Leonardo Moroni
Alessandro Stradivari b. 1602 | Anna Moroni m. 1622
Giuseppe Giulio Cesare b. 1623 | Carlo Felice b. 1626 | Giovanni Battista b. 1628 | Antonio Stradivari c. 1644–1737 | Francesca Ferraboschi; 1640–1698 m. 1667 | Antonia Maria Zambelli c. 1664–1737 m. 1699
Giulia Maria c. 1667– | Francesco; 1670–1670 | Francesco; 1671–1743 | Catterina Annunciata; 1674–1748 | Alessandro Giuseppe; 1677–1732 | Omobono Stradivari; 1679–1742 | Francesca Maria; 1700–1720 | Giovanni Battista Giuseppe; 1701–1702 | Giovanni Battista Martino; 1703–1727 | Giuseppe Antonio; 1704–1781 | Paolo; 1708–1776
