= Colleverde =

- Frazione
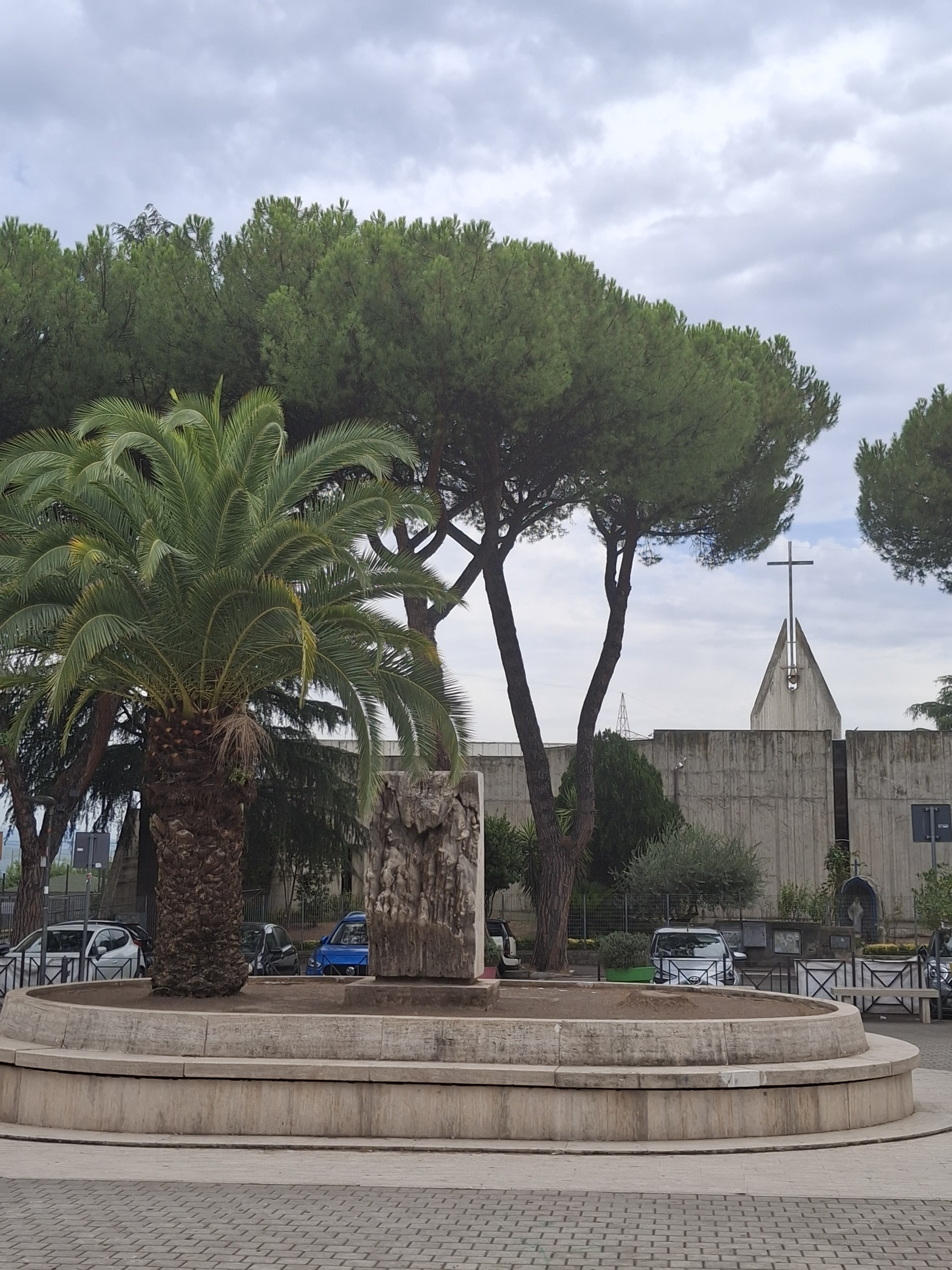
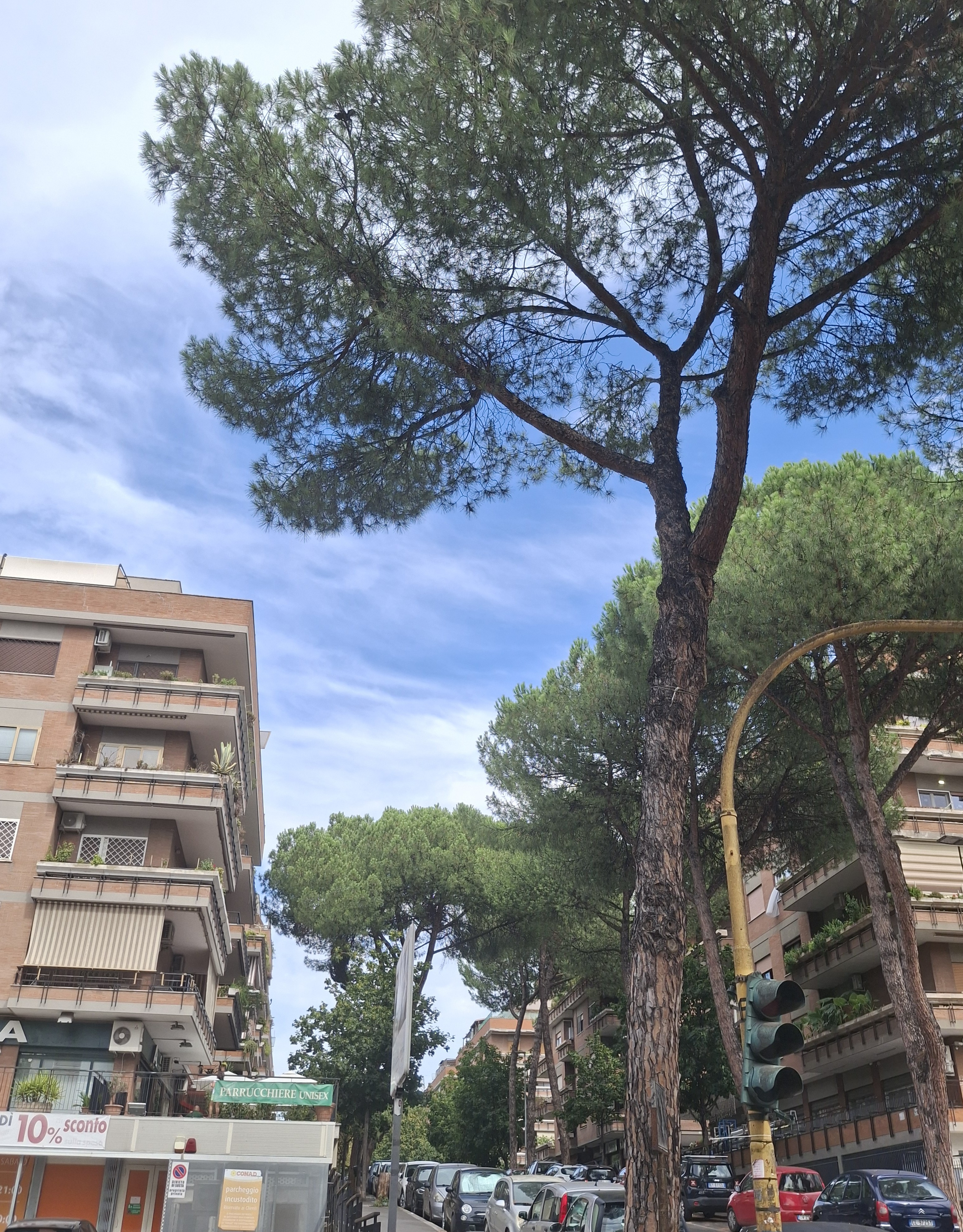
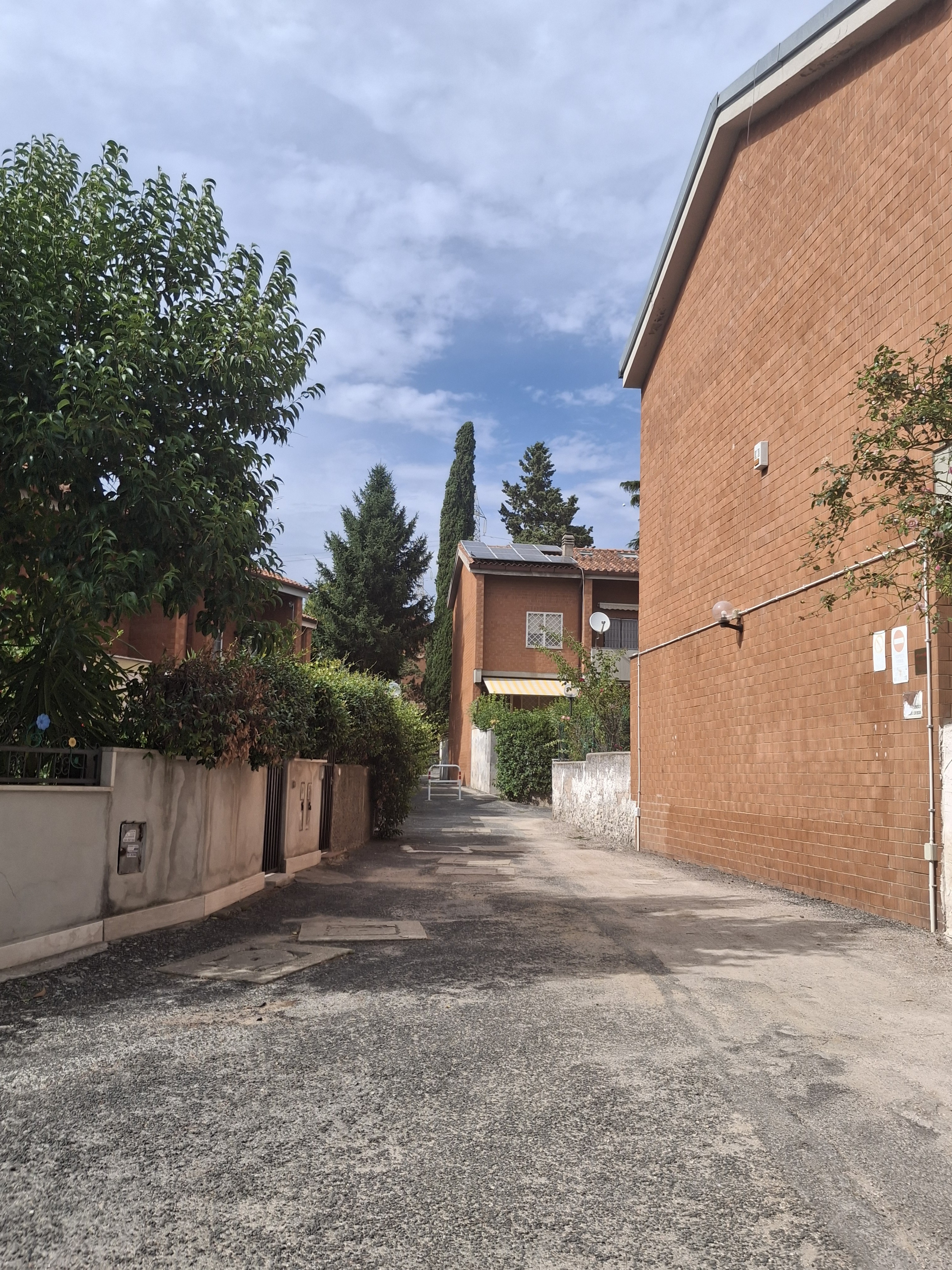

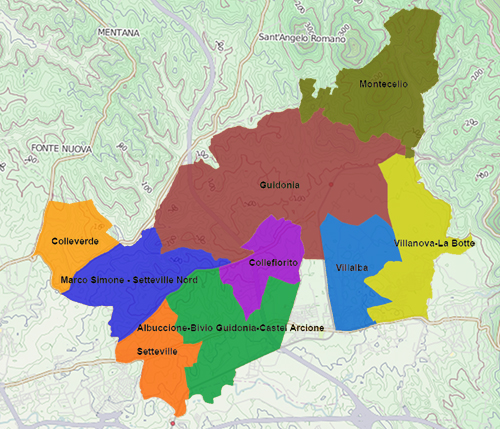
- Administrative divisions of the municipality of Guidonia Montecelio

- Location within Italy
- Coordinates: 41°58′50.52″N 12°37′36.8″E
- Country: Italy
- Region: Lazio
- Province: Rome
- First settled: Roman era
- First modern urban settlements: 1970

Area
  - Total: 15,703 km^{2} (6,063 sq mi)

Population (2016)
  - Total: 4,777
  - Density: 3,042/km^{2} (7,880/sq mi)
- Time zone: UTC+1
- Postal code: 00012

Colleverde is a frazione of the comune sparso of Guidonia Montecelio, in the Metropolitan City of Rome Capital of Lazio.

== History ==
=== Ancient history ===
The name of the frazione comes from the name of the hill the urban center developed itself on over the years. During the existence of the Roman Empire the area was inhabited. This can be testified by the presence of a hypogeum located in Parco Azzurro which might have been part of the suburbs of the larger Roman urban center known as Nomentum or, alternatively, of the suburbs of Crustumerium. The hypogeum has two underground floors, the first one containing a warehouse and the second one a series of tombs.

The archeological site is not located very far from Via Nomentana (being located between 15 and 16 km from the area). As of now the only way to access the site is to ask the custodian of Parco Azzurro.

=== Early modern history ===
On the other side of Via Nomentana there are what are locally known as case nuove (new houses), initially inhabited by monks and later on by noble families. Currently the building is used for civilian-related reasons. The architecture of the case nuove has a "rural romanesque" style; the entrance presents a triangular pediment, whilst the door on the right is arched and was initially owned by the Monastery of Saint Paul Outside the Walls. From 1528 it belonged to the Tre Fontane Abbey, then to the Bolis family, then to the Moroni family, and now to the Bona family.

e style of the church resembles the ones that were popular back in the second half of the 20th century. It is located in "Colleverde square". Inside some paintings from local artists can be seen.

=== Contemporary history ===
Today's urban area of Colleverde started to develop in the 1970. It was followed in the 1980s by the creation of other areas adjacent to it, such as Colleverde 2, Vena d'Oro and Parco Azzurro, composed of terraced and detached houses, sometimes with big gardens within them and an architecture similar to Swiss chalets.

Since 1971 the area was promoted as a place where to peacefully live and for young families to start over whilst staying near Rome. Initially, the urban area revolved solely around the first modern road built in the area, via Monte Bianco. The first significant wave of settlers arrived in 1977 (prior to that the area was mainly inhabited by sparse merchants) from Sicily. The local church was inaugurated by Pope John Paul II in 1990.

In 1995, Vincenzo Silvano Casulli discovered asteroid 7665 Putignano, which he named after his hometown Putignano.

Throughout the 2000s and 2010s there was a presence of right-wing extremists in the area. The extremists included CasaPound, S.P.Q.R. Skins, Comunità Militante RAIDO and Blood & Honour which had occupied a building within Colleverde, naming it "Casa d'Italia a Colleverde" (House of Italy in Colleverde). The building became a meeting point for various far righters from Italy, England and other nations. Despite the illegal occupation, which started in 2007, the far right extremists were not kicked out up until 2019. The area continued to be ideologically tense even after the various organizations were kicked out of it, with incidents such as recurring fascist symbolism and the vandalization of an anti-fascist mural located on a local school.
