= David Laurie =

19th-century violin collector (1833–1897)

David Laurie (Netherton, 1833 – Brussels, 1897) was a distinguished 19th-century violin collector (known worldwide, as good friend of J. B. Vuillaume).

Born in 1833 in Netherton, Kinross-shire Scotland, he was an only son of John Laurie laird of Drunzie, Kinross-shire. He married and had six children with his first wife and then after her death married again and had twelve more children.

He was an oil merchant, as well as an amateur violinist, though his passion was fiddle collecting which eventually changed to his livelihood. His personal violin was the "Alard" Stradivari of 1715, which he bought from Alard in 1876 (upon his retirement). Prior to that, in the mid-19th century the instrument was bought by a banker from Belgium in Florence and subsequently passed to J. B. Vuillaume in Paris who gave it to his son-in-law M. Delphin Alard a professor of violin at the Paris Conservatory. Mr. Laurie once was offered £2,000 for the "Alard" Strad which he refused.

He amassed a great collection of the finest string instruments in the world. Among the many great instruments which passed through him were:

Antonio Stradivari (STRADIVARIUS) violin(s) of 1684 "Wilmotte", 1688, 1701, 1702, the "Dancla Stradivarius (1703)", the "Lafont" of 1708, the "Ernst"of 1709, 1710, 1712, ex- "Marquis de Sayve" of 1713, "Cremonese" now known as the ex-Joachim of 1715, the "Alard" of 1715, 1717, another ex- "Joachim" of 1722, 1726, The 1734 "Gibson" Viola as well.

Also Stradivari cello(s) the "Gore-Booth" of 1710, and the "Bass of Spain" of 1713. Del Gesu "Il Canone", "King Joseph" Guarnerius Del Gesu, the d'Egville of 1735 and the "Leduc" of 1743/5 Del Gesus, as well one c. 1744.

Other instruments include an Amati violin of 1688, Nicolò Amati violin 1645 (sold to J. Joachim), Bergonzi tenor, Bergonzi cello, Lupot violin, Ex- Garcin J.B. Vuillaume of 1868 violin (which he bought from Garcin), and another Vuillaume violin of 1874 which showcases inlaid ebony fleur-de-lys designs and is one of the last instruments to come out of Vuillaume's workshop, made a year before his death. "Made for the famous violin dealer David Laurie, it's a copy of a Nicolò Amati violin originally belonging to Prince Nikolai Borisovich Yusupov (junior) (a Russian aristocrat and pupil of Henri Vieuxtemps). Only six copies were made."

According to Laurie's book "Reminiscences of a Fiddle Dealer" c. 1900, he purchased a big collection of rare instruments in Saint Petersburg. He tells the story of how he received a letter from a widow in Saint Petersburg, Russia whose husband left a collection of rare and expensive string instruments, and that many of her friends advised her to connect with David Laurie to see if he would be interested in purchasing them. This whole account was featured in an article by Gennady Filimonov in the STRAD magazine June 2023, as he discovered the name of the nobleman (which eluded everyone since 1876), and all of the instruments, which included three Stradivari cellos (including the Wilmotte/St. Senoch and the Bass of Spain), as well as a 1708 Antonio Stradivari violin, Guarneri Del Gesu c. 1742 (which the nobleman gifted to a talented young violinist Aleksandra Unkovskaya born Zakharina) now part of the Russian State Collection, a St. Nicolas J.B. Vuillaume c. 1872 violin (which was a gift from Vuillaume to the Russian Nobleman Nikolai Alexandrovich Haller for purchasing a big collection) which Haller gifted to Sonya Zakharina (Aleksandra's sister), Nicolo Amati violin and a Carlo Bergonzi viola. This fascinating account sheds light on some of these famous instruments and their illustrious owner.

He conducted his business from his home 36 Lansdowne Crescent, Glasgow. David Laurie died in Brussels, 1897.

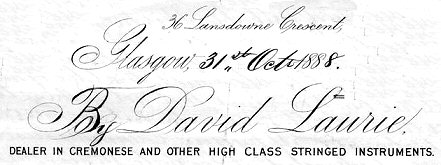
David Laurie Letter Head

== Quotes ==
"...I will now relate the purchase and sale of a grand Stradivarius violin, which while giving me a good deal of trouble one way and another, also brought me fame as a reliable expert.

According to Laurie, expertise in identifying string instruments requires visual and auditory training, as well as a strong memory, to recognize the unique design characteristics of different instrument makers.

The third gift is not considered by any means necessary to the making of an expert, yet I think I am justified in saying that a good ear plays an important part in the work and is a valuable gift, which ought to be cultivated and developed to its utmost, if it were for nothing else than to be able to distinguish one tone from another and to decide which has the best carrying power and which is in most repute with the majority of musical folk, artistes and amateurs alike.

For after all, to the great majority of concert-goers the tone of a violin is the most important part of it, and they neither know nor care who the maker is so long as the player delights them with its music. In this purchase which I am about to relate I put my ear to a severe test in judging whether a fiddle was likely to be worth purchasing or not and it did not fail me." - The Reminiscences of a Fiddle Dealer was published three times. First edition published in London in 1924, Third edition was published by Harold M. Chaitman in 1977.

In discussing violin set up with his clients, David Laurie stated: "Take your violin to a reliable man, and get it mounted and let the mountings alone. Just so surely as you begin altering this or that you alter the tone, and undo the work of some experienced man who knows his business." If you love your violin, follow this advice and you will not regret it."

== Bibliography ==
- The STRAD magazine June, 2023 On The Trail of a Russian Nobleman by Gennady Filimonov
- https://www.thestrad.com/lutherie/on-the-trail-of-a-1708-stradivari-jt-carrodus-and-a-mystery-violin/16402.article On the trail of a 1708 Stradivari: J.T. Carrodus and a mystery violin by Gennady Filimonov June 2023 The STRAD magazine
- The Reminiscences of a Fiddle Dealer by David Laurie
- Violin Fraud: Deception, Forgery, Theft, and Lawsuits in England and America By Brian W. Harvey
- The Voller Brothers: A colour preview - Andrew Fairfax
- Published in The Strad magazine Vol. 104 No. 1233 Jan. 1993
- "Violins, Vuillaume - A Great French Violin Maker of the 19th century". The Multimedia Encyclopedia. 1999.Les Edition Montparnasse
- Les Luthiers Parisiens aux XIX et XX siecles Tom 3 "Jean-Baptiste Vuillaume et sa famille : Nicolas, Nicolas-François et Sébastien" by Sylvette Milliot published by Edition les Amis des la Musique 2006
- Jost Thöne: J.B.Vuillaume, Bildband mit originalgrossen Abbildungen, Bocholt 1998.
- Jean-Baptiste Vuillaume - Violins and Violinists Series of Violin Makers published by William Lewis and Son
- Les Trésors de la Lutherie Française du XIXe siècle, Paris c 1992
- The Henry Hottinger Collection, Rembert Wurlitzer, Inc., New York, 1966 Henry Hottinger Collection
- Stradivarius - Guarnerius Del Gesu / Catalogue descriptif de leurs instrument - Charles-Eugene Gand
- Vannes, Rene (1985) [1951]. Dictionnaire Universel del Luthiers (vol.3). Bruxelles: Les Amis de la musique. OCLC 53749830.
- William, Henley (1969). Universal Dictionary of Violin & Bow Makers. Brighton; England: Amati. ISBN 0-901424-00-5.
- Walter Hamma, Meister Italienischer Geigenbaukunst, Wilhelmshaven 1993, ISBN 3-7959-0537-0
- Millant, Roger (1972). J. B. Vuillaume: Sa Vie et son Oeuvre (in French). London: W.E. Hill. OCLC 865746.
- Giuseppe Guarneri del Gesú, Carlos Chiesa, John Dilworth, Roger Graham Hargrave, Stewart Pollens, Duane Rosengard & Eric Wen, Peter Biddulph, London, 1998.
- Tarisio and ‘Le Messie’ : Antoine Vidal, Bowed Instruments (Vol. I)
- W.E. Hill & Sons, Antonio Stradivari: His Life & Work, monograph on the “Salabue” Strad and finally Farga, Violins & Violinists.
- On Old Violins - Lucien Greilsamer, Jay C. Freeman and Theodore Baker
- The Hill Collection – David D. Boyden
- Antonio Stradivari – Henley
- 1690 &1716 Tuscan & Le Messie – Hill
- Violin Iconography of Antonio Stradivari - Hebert K. Goodkind
- How Many Strads – E. Doring
- Antonio Stradivari - Charles Beare
- Italian Violin Makers – Walter Henley
