= Violin authentication =

Violin authentication is the process of determining the maker and date of a violin. Multiple references may be required to assist in the process of authentication. This is often employed to combat fraudulent practices such as violin forgery and other forms of misrepresentation.

== Motivation for authentication ==
Much of the price of a fine violin is determined not just by the quality of the instrument, but by the maker. Names like Amati, Guarneri, and Stradivari have become synonymous with excellence in craftsmanship and tone. Relatively unknown makers, capable of producing above-average violins, know that they might be able to command tremendous prices simply by affixing the label of one of these early makers to the instruments of their making. The temptation has been, at times, irresistible. In its newest incarnation, however, instrument fraud appears to have shifted away from the production of clever fakes. The practice of merely misrepresenting the quality of the instrument is on the rise. To combat these and other such practices, the buyer may do well to consult an authenticator to confirm the maker, date, quality and price before purchasing an instrument, particularly when there are huge sums of money at stake.

== Authentication process ==
Authenticating a violin is a multifaceted process that addresses two issues surrounding the authenticity of an instrument: the year in which it was manufactured, and the maker (essentially the information found on the label). To confirm these two attributes, the authenticator may employ several different techniques. The key to authentication is the idea that there is no single feature of a violin that exists independently of another. This implies that knowing the date narrows the number of makers, just as knowing the maker narrows the field of dates.
