= Pietro Guarneri =

Italian luthier (1695–1762)

Pietro Guarnieri (14 April 1695 – 7 April 1762) was an Italian luthier. Sometimes referred to as Pietro da Venezia, he was the son of Giuseppe Giovanni Battista Guarneri, filius Andreae, and the last of the Guarneri house of violin-makers

Guarnieri lived in Cremona with his father until 1717. Finding life in Casa Guarnieri in some way uncongenial, he left Cremona for good in 1717. The master arrived and settled in Venice 1717. Here he blended the Cremonese techniques of his father with Venetian, working with Comel, Gobbetti and Tononi. The Venetian makers of the same period were Matteo Goffriller, Carlo Annibale Tononi, Francesco Gobbetti, Domenico Montagnana and Sanctus Seraphin. He married Angiola Maria Ferrari on 5 April 1728, with whom he had eleven children.

His first original labels from Venice date from 1721. His instruments are rare and as highly prized as those of his father and uncle.

== Famous Instruments ==
- 1723 violin, "Thibaud"
- 1726 violoncello, "Esterhazy"
- 1739 violoncello, "Beatrice Harrison"
- 1747 violin, "Joachim"

== See also ==
- Guarneri family
- Pietro Giovanni Guarneri (of Mantua)
