= Vincenzo Rugeri =

Italian luthier (1663–1719)

- Born: 30 September 1663; Cremona, Italy
- Died: 4 May 1719 (aged 55)
- Occupation: luthier

Vincenzo Rugeri (30 September 1663 – 4 May 1719) (also known as Ruger, Rugier, Rugieri, Ruggeri, Ruggieri, Ruggerius), was an Italian luthier of string instruments such as violins, cellos, and, violas in Cremona, Italy. His instruments are noted for their craftsmanship and tone quality. Vincenzo came from a distinguished family of luthiers, the first of whom was his father, Francesco Rugeri. Despite the local tradition of artisan families laboring together through generations, Vincenzo left the family shop and set up a successful shop of his own in the center of Cremona. Vincenzo was the third son of luthier Francesco Rugeri. Vincenzo's work, like Francesco's, is influenced by Nicolò Amati's Grand Pattern model, however Vincenzo's work was distinguished from his father's by utilizing a lower arch inspired by Antonio Stradivari. An analysis of the body of his work reveals that the quality of Vincenzo's instruments is remarkable, perhaps even more so than his father's. Vincenzo's instruments, though less numerous, are valued at least equal to those of his father. A violin by Vincenzo Rugeri realized $502,320 on October 3, 2011 at Brompton's Auctions in London. Carlo Bergonzi was a distinguished apprentice of Vincenzo Rugeri.

== Early life ==
Vincenzo Rugeri was born just outside of the city limits of Cremona, Italy in the Parish of San Bernardo on 30 September 1663. By the age of apprenticeship, he was working alongside his two older brothers, Giovanni Battista Rugeri (2 July 1653 – 14 December 1711) and Giacinto Rugeri (15 May 1661 – 2 June 1697) assisting in their father's shop. Some instruments purported to be by Francesco Rugeri are actually the work of Vincenzo. All the brothers were capable workmen, ably assisting in the workshop, however it was only Vincenzo who later enjoyed individual success as a luthier and further developed the Rugeri style. By 1687, Francesco had acquired land and a home closer to the city of Cremona in the Parish of San Sebastiano next to the beautiful Convent of San Sigismondo. Vincenzo likely followed the family to San Sebastiano and lived there until 1689 when he married. Even though Vincenzo's youngest brother, Carlo Rugeri (1666–1713) inherited Francesco's tools relating to "violins, guitars, violoni, and calascioni," Carlo does not appear to have been significantly involved with the family's violin shop based on the extremely rare instruments that are attributed to him.

== Career ==
By 1690, Vincenzo Rugeri had married, left the family shop, and opened his own shop in the northwest side of Cremona. Rugeri prospered as an independent violin maker in his own right despite competition with the Stradivari and Guarneri families. His productions date from about 1680–1717. His confirmed works are based on the Nicolo Amati Grand Pattern model combined with a more tonally advanced lower arch. His work is characterized by a high standard of conception and workmanship and the maple wood he employed for the backs was often of fine foreign growth. Rugeri used a transparent varnish ranging in color from orange to red, or brown later in his career. This varnish recipe seems to be congruent with certain of Antonio Stradivari's late instruments and those of Carlo Bergonzi. The treatment of the channel around the edges of his instruments shows less scooping than other makers of the period. Some of Rugeri's instruments include original "wings" of maple in the backs. His F-holes, while Amati-like, have narrower upright stems and an upright upper curve.

A look at one of Vincenzo’s violin, the “Baron Knoop”, from circa 1700 shows that the Vincenzo based this instrument off of the Grand Amati model from the Cremonese school. This violin, like many of Vincenzo's instruments, is made of foreign maple, with an orange-brown transparent varnish with features flatter arches with fuller edges. The soundholes that the Rugeri family used distinguishes them from other Cremonese makers- they were often stiffer, or more narrow and the curves were more upright than the Amati.

Towards the last years of the 17th century, Rugeri's shop flourished financially as evidenced by Vincenzo buying up property around his workshop. Upon examining his 1719 will however, it is apparent that he experienced a decline in circumstances by 1719. His production seems to have slowed after about 1710 probably owing to competition from the Stradivari workshop. Rugeri had two sons: Francesco (b Cremona 15 July 1704) and Carlo Giuseppe who were listed as violin makers by trade, however there are no known surviving instruments by either of them. Instruments bearing Vincenzo's name after his death in 1719 through about 1740 are possibly instruments made or finished by his sons but labelled with Vincenzo's name.

== Teaching ==
Vincenzo Rugeri was the first teacher of Carlo Bergonzi. Previously, Giuseppe Giovanni Battista Guarneri and Antonio Stradivari had been erroneously postulated as being Bergonzi's first teachers by W.E. Hill & Sons and Count Ignazio Alessandro Cozio di Salabue. Carlo Bergonzi and his family lived in close proximity to Vincenzo's workshop in Cremona, which would have been the most obvious place for apprenticeship for Carlo in about 1696, given the social and financial connections between the two families. Carlo Bergonzi's mother was the Godmother to Vincenzo's daughter, Teresa.

When comparing the work of Bergonzi with Vincenzo Rugeri, their similarity of work is apparent in the treatment of the scrolls, the use of beech purfling, the lack of dorsal thicknessing pins, and the working technique of scarfing the linings into the corner blocks at an angle instead of square. Bergonzi's early works such as the "Thibaud" violin from 1715 and others from this early period follow similar outlines and proportions to Vincenzo Rugeri's violins as can be expected, however the outlines of Bergonzi's later instruments became his own.

== Labels ==
The labels contained in the instruments made by the Rugeri family include the words "detto il Per" following the makers's name. While the meaning of "il Per" is unknown and might indicate a form of provincialism, documents do indicate it was a way to distinguish the family from other Rugeri families of the region.

For example, in the San Bernardo parish, to which the Rugeri family belonged, there were no fewer than five other Rugeri families listed, including 2 of Francesco's brothers. In order to limit confusion, Francesco’s brother Carlo Rugeri added the nickname “Per” to the family surname as early as the 1660s. The burial records of the death in 1680 of Francesco’s father, Vincenzo’s grandfather, also uses the name "Gio. Batta. Ruggeri detto il Per." Only one year later, Giovanni Battista, one of Vincenzo’s brothers, witnessed a marriage. On the certificate for his name, the priest only wrote Giovanni Battista Per. This signature indicates that by 1681, the family nickname "per" was even more important than the Rugeri name. Like that of Francesco, Vincenzo included the words "detto il Per" in his labels.

During the same time period that the Rugeri family was making violins in Cremona, the Rogeri family was also crafting string instruments in Brescia. These two luthier families with one letter of difference in their surname, living less than 40 miles apart, needed to have distinction from each other not only by quality and craftsmanship, but by name recognition.

== The Cremonese School ==
Cremona, Italy is known for its rich history in the design and production of string instruments. Indeed, the greatest luthiers of all time are Cremonese. Violin workshops in Cremona can trace their origins back to the beginning of the sixteenth century. As economic development began to take place at the turn of the century, so did the developments in artistic production and commerce within the city. It is around this time that violin makers like Andrea Amati, Antonio Stradivari, and Francesco Rugeri began their individual practices. The main reason for the production of string instruments at this time was to provide court entertainment for the French royalty.

== Rugeri's Instruments ==
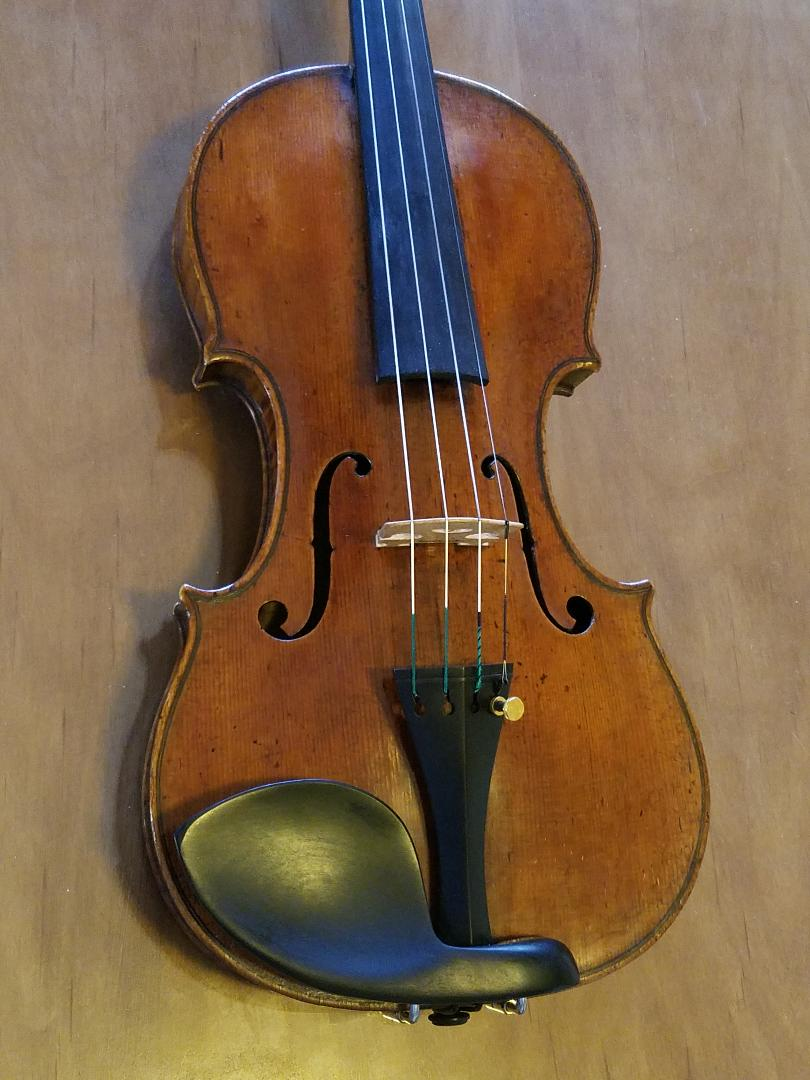
A Rugeri violin.

It is estimated that there are 38 violins, 15 cellos, and five or fewer violas made by Vincenzo Rugeri still in existence, for example:

- The violin collector David L. Fulton owns a 1697 viola by Vincenzo.
- A violin dated 1697 and a cello dated 1693 by Vincenzo are in the collections of the Chimei Museum.
- "Baron Knoop" violin by Vincenzo Rugeri 1700c—Once thought by the Hills to be one of the finest existing Francesco Rugeri violins, it is now known to be a very fine violin by Vincenzo.
- Violinist Stefan Jackiw performs exclusively on a violin by Vincenzo dated 1704.
- "Le Brun" violin by Vincenzo made in 1705 was formerly owned by Charles Lebrun and was formerly in the collection of the Royal Academy of Music.
- Yoonshin Song, Concertmaster of the Detroit Symphony Orchestra, plays a 1707 violin by Vincenzo Rugeri on loan to her from a sponsor.
- A violin by Vincenzo Rugeri was lost when the SS Flying Enterprise sank in 1952.
