= Pietro Giovanni Guarneri =

Italian violin maker (1655–1720)

Pietro Giovanni Guarneri (1655–1720), also known as Pietro da Mantua or Peter Guarnerius of Mantua, was a violin maker of the Guarneri family who also worked as a professional musician. Today his instruments are highly regarded, though quite rare. They are played by musicians such as Joseph Szigeti.

== Biography ==
Pietro Guarneri was the eldest son of the master luthier Andrea Guarneri and Anna Maria di Orcelli, born in Cremona, Italy on 18 February 1655. Although the exact date he began working in his father's workshop is unknown, experts have found traces of his workmanship beginning about 1670 in instruments labeled as Andrea Guarneri. His work appears in many instruments between 1670 and 1678, and some seem to be wholly his own work though, unlike his younger brother Giuseppe filius Andrea Guarneri, he never used his own label while working with their father. His early work shows not only promising ability and craftsmanship, but also a pronounced tendency to express his own personality and follow his own ideas. He quickly developed his own style, noticeable in its distinctive f-holes, precise corners and purfling, and a fuller arching than his father used. Evidence from his father's will indicates that father and son did not work together in the family workshop harmoniously, and Pietro left Cremona altogether in 1679, eventually establishing himself in Mantua.

In 1677 Pietro married Caterina Sassagni, and they had a son in the following year. In 1694, he appears in the census in Mantua as having remarried to Lucia Guidi, and having five children, none of whom followed their father into violin making.

Even while he was in Cremona violin making was not his only interest. He also developed himself as a violin and viol player. By 1685, he was accomplished enough to perform for the Duke of Mantua as a violin soloist, and play a viol in the Mantuan Court Orchestra. His musicianship is unique among the great Italian violin makers of the classical period. He is the only one who left any record of musical ability, and certainly the only one who pursued both violin making and performing professionally. He also appears to be the earliest known violin maker in the city of Mantua, though doubtless there were many viol and lute makers. The city was already famous for its music, being home to the composer Monteverdi and Duke Vincenzo I of Gonzaga, a composer and patron of the arts. His performing resulted in his making few instruments. Today not more than fifty of his violins are thought to exist, and there are no known violas or violoncelli. (Note: Although William Henry Hill states that there are no Pietro Guarneri violoncelli in his 1931 book The Violin Makers of the Guarneri Family: Their Life and Work, in 1951 Emil Herrmann, a respected authority on stringed instruments, certified a 'cello that was labeled and had been previously attributed to Andrea Guarneri as made by his son Pietro.)

== Instruments ==
Pietro inherited from his father basics of the Amati form and concept of the violin, but his style quickly developed as distinctly his own. His workmanship was much finer and more controlled than his father's, and his instruments demonstrate a harmony of elements rarely equaled by his father, which indicates a superior eye for form. The earliest instrument that exhibits Pietro's personal label is dated 1685, and was made in Mantua. This instrument's curves are slightly stiffened and elongated in a Stradivarian style. In general Pietro's instruments were the standard 14 inches long, and tended to be of a narrow pattern with rather elongated bouts. The corners and edgework were light, delicate and deeply fluted. His f-holes were based on an Amati template, but the top and bottom holes were larger than any Amati's, and the nicks more deeply cut.

Even before he left his father's workshop, Pietro experimented with ornamentation on his instruments, possibly to increase their value. He sometimes added fleur-de-lis at the corners and at times added a second line of purfling. However his attempts at embellishment always fell short those he was probably copying: Nicolò Amati and Antonio Stradivari.

From 1700 onward, he abandoned the Amati-like delicacy of his earlier work and adopted a larger, more masculine style. His model remained basically the same, though with increased width, enlarged edges, corners and f-holes. His massive scrolls are especially distinctive in this period, with the intermediate turn of the volute being left so high that the eyes appear dwarfed.

Throughout his career Pietro Guarneri was fastidious in his choice of wood. He accepted no compromises, and his maple is often of foreign growth and exceptional appearance. His varnish, likewise, was first quality, ranging in colour from golden-brown to orange to a brilliant red.
