= Barak Norman =

English luthier (1651 - 1724)

- Born: c.1670 England
- Died: c.1740 London
- Engineering career
- Practice name: luthier

Barak Norman (1651–1724) was an English string instrument maker. He was an important and prolific English maker of viols, violins & 'cellos. He was apprenticed in the Guild of Weavers in 1668, and probably received instruction from Richard Meares. His viols are the epitome of the elegant English style of the period. Early specimens are highly arched but later ones have medium arching and elaborate double purfling. The earliest recorded label naming Barak Norman as maker (on a viol) is dated 1690.

Norman is believed to have had Daniel Parker as an apprentice.
