= Soil Stradivarius =

Violin made by Antonio Stradivari

The Soil Stradivarius (pronounced [swal]) of 1714 is an antique violin made by Italian luthier Antonio Stradivari of Cremona (1644–1737). It is one of 700 known extant Stradivari instruments. The instrument was made during Stradivari's "golden period" and is named after the Belgian industrialist Amédée Soil. The current owner of the violin is violinist Itzhak Perlman.

== Ownership ==
The Soil was acquired by Yehudi Menuhin in 1950, who played on it for several decades. It was sold in 1986 to its current owner, Itzhak Perlman, who played this instrument while recording the Cinema Serenade with the Pittsburgh Symphony Orchestra in 1997. The extended provenance of this violin includes the French luthier and collector Jean-Baptiste Vuillaume and the Viennese collector Oscar Bondy, who also owned the Hellier Stradivarius of 1679.

== Characteristics ==
A product of Stradivari’s golden period, it is considered one of his finest. One of two Stradivari violins named after Belgian industrialist Amédée Soil, this instrument is characterized by its brilliant red varnish and a two-piece maple back with the flames of the grain joined, descending from the edges toward the center.

Other sobriquet Soil violins are the Stradivari of 1708 and two by Giuseppe Guarneri del Gesù, 1733 and 1736.
