= Celsi =

Venetian family

The Celsi coat of arms - 'D'azzurro, alla banda d'oro accostata da due cotisse del medesimo accompagnate da 6 D in carattere gotico pure del medesimo'

The House of Celsi was a patrician family in Venice. Its most notable members were doge Lorenzo Celsi and soldier Bartolomeo Celsi.

Traditionally held to have originated in Ravenna, the family is first documented in 1122 with Vitale Celsi's mention in a pact between the Baresi and Domenico Michiel. Paolo Celsi was one of those who elected doge Orio Mastropiero in 1178, whilst in 1202 Pietro Celsi commanded the gallies in Enrico Dandolo's reconquest of Zara. Nicolò Celsi was recorded as Procurator of Saint Mark in 1268 and as having died in 1277.

Few or no other members of the family played a part in Venetian public life and Lorenzo Celsi's election as doge in 1351 after a bright political and military career was unexpected. Lorenzo arranged for his father Marco to be made a Procurator of Saint Mark in 1363. The family's public role declined again after that dogeship, although the brothers Giacomo, Giovanni and Bartolomeo fought in the military operations leading up to the Battle of Lepanto (1571). Other members of the family went on to administrative roles, such as Marcantonio Celsi, count and captain of Sebenico (1708) and then supervisor of Veglia (1714), and Marino, supervisor of Salò (1708). The family line went extinct on the death of Francesco Maria Celsi in 1789.
