= Francesco Rugeri =

Italian luthier (1628–1698)

- Born: 1628; Cremona, Duchy of Milan
- Died: 28 October 1698 (aged 69–70); Cremona, Duchy of Milan
- Resting place: Church of the Holy Trinity, Crema, Cremona
- Education: Nicola Amati
- Known for: Luthier
- Style: Rugeri style; Amati style
- Movement: Cremonese school

Francesco Rugeri (Note: Also known as Ruger, Rugier, Rugeri, Ruggeri, Ruggieri, and Ruggerius) (c. 1628 – 28 October 1698) was an Italian master luthier from Cremona, Italy. The first of the important lutheir family Casa Rugeri, his violins were inspired by Nicolò Amati's "Grand Amati" pattern. Rugeri was the first to develop a smaller cello design, which has since become standard. Today, Rugeri's instruments are nearly as renowned as Amati's.

The Rugeri family is not to be confused with the Rogeri family of Brescia who were also noted luthiers following the tradition of Amati.

== Apprenticeship ==
He was perhaps the earliest apprentice of Nicolò Amati, another important luthier in Cremona, Italy, although some sources call this association into question as there is no census record showing his presence in the Amati household. This could be explained by the possibility of Francesco living and boarding at his own home while apprenticing, rather than being an indoor apprentice. Antonio Stradivari's name also never appears in the records, despite being another possible pupil.

W.E. Hill & Sons note that the "unmistakable" handiwork of Francesco Rugeri can be found in select pieces by Nicolo Amati and, just like Antonio Stradivari and Andrea Guarneri, Francesco sometimes included the words "Alumnus Nicolai Amati" on his labels, further adding to the evidence of his apprenticeship. For example, there exists a violin labelled "Francescus Rugerius Alumnus Nicolai Amati fecit Cremonæ 1663".

Nicolò Amati was the godfather to one of Francesco's sons, Giacinto (born in 1658 and lived only a few months), indicating that the two families at least shared a close relationship and close collaboration would seem likely. Francesco later had another son whom he also named Giacinto, who was born in 1661.

In 1685, a court case was brought by a violinist seeking relief from the Duke of Modena as a victim of fraud. In this case, the violinist and composer Tomaso Antonio Vitali had bought a violin purporting to be a creation of Nicolò Amati, but he discovered that under the Amati label was the label of Francesco Rugeri. There was a price difference in those days of 3 to 1 on Amati vs. Rugeri violins, so this was a serious matter. However, this case may also indicate that Rugeri, who was working in the shadow of the great Cremona makers—Amati, Guarneri, and Stradivari—had resorted to a desperate act to make a sale.

Some researchers believe there is a closer educational association between Antonio Stradivari and Francesco Rugeri than previously thought. Despite the long-held belief that Antonio Stradivari was a pupil of Nicolò Amati, there are important discrepancies between their work. Some researchers believe early instruments by Stradivari bear a stronger resemblance to Francesco Rugeri's work than Amati's. Additionally, the use of a small dorsal pin or small hole, invariably used not just by Nicolò Amati but all of his recognized pupils—with the exception of Antonio Stradivari—adds further evidence that Stradivari may have learnt his craft apart from Amati. This pin or hole was fundamental in the graduation of the thickness of the plates, and was obviously a technique passed on through generations of pupils of the Amati. This dorsal pin is also not found in any of the instruments of the Rugeri family, suggesting Antonio Stradivari may have actually learnt his craft from Francesco Rugeri, although both being influenced by Amati. W.E. Hill & Sons concede that they fail to find the hand of Stradivari in any of Nicolo Amati's work, although the unmistakable hands of Andrea Guarneri and Francesco Rugeri are evident.

Count Ignazio Alessandro Cozio di Salabue and other early violin connoisseurs, such as the Mantegazza brothers, seemed to confuse the families of the Rugeri working in Cremona with the family of Giovanni Battista Rogeri working in Brescia. The two families both followed the Amati tradition; however, their work is distinctive from each other and not thought to be related. The Rugeri family included the words "il Per" or "detto il Per" in their labels and, from 1669 onward, in almost all of the religious and legal documents pertaining to the family, most likely to distinguish them from the many other Rugeri families in the region.

== Career ==
Francesco lived and worked just outside of the walls of Cremona, Italy, in the Parishes of San Bernardo at No. 7 Contrada Coltellai; later, by 1687, he had moved to the Parish of San Sebastiano. In San Sebastiano he lived next to the convent of San Sigismondo, one of the finest buildings in Cremona. His most productive period was during the 1670s and 1680s, during which time he was assisted by his three sons and closely followed the designs of Nicolò Amati, sometimes even placing Amati labels in his instruments. His success peaked after Nicolò Amati's decline and before the rise of Antonio Stradivari. Francesco's violins were characterized by a high level of craftsmanship and a very slightly higher arch. After 1670, Francesco was ably assisted by 3 of his sons in his workshop. The Rugeri tradition was carried on and further developed by Francesco's son Vincenzo Rugeri, the only one of his sons to have an independent, successful career as a luthier. Some instruments purportedly by Francesco are actually the work of Vincenzo.

Francesco was buried in the Church of San Trinita.

=== Cello size pioneer ===
Francesco Rugeri was the first to make cellos smaller than what was typical, being 4 inches (10 cm) smaller than those made by other Cremonese luthiers, namely Amati and Stradivari. The size of Rugeri's cellos are now standard. Other cellos of the period are often unmanageable for modern players unless severely cut down in size.

=== Casa Rugeri ===
Francesco is the founder of the Rugeri family of violin makers. Francesco married Ippolito Ravasi in 1652 in the Church of San Bernardo. They had a total of 10 children (six sons and 4 daughters) although some died young. Three of his six sons followed his footsteps in string instruments making. Francesco had two sons he named Giacinto—the first was born in 1658 and baptized 19 November 1658 with Nicolò Amati being the Godfather. Unfortunately, Giacinto only lived a few months following his baptism. The fact that Amati was his Godfather demonstrates that Rugeri and Amati at least shared a close relationship. Francesco's third son, Vincenzo, became the most important luthier of Francesco's sons and carried on the Rugeri tradition after Francesco's death.

Other luthiers in the family are:

- Giovanni Battista Rugeri (b. 2 July 1653; d. 14 December 1711) was the eldest son of Francesco Rugeri. He married in 1677 and moved briefly to another Parish, however returned to San Bernardo to presumably continue work in Francesco's shop. Although a capable luthier, his independent work is extremely rare. Hieronymus Amati II, son of Nicolò Amati, was a Godfather to one of Giovanni Battista's son's.
- Giacinto Rugeri (b. 15 May 1661; d. 2 June 1697) was the second son of Francesco Rugeri and was also a capable worker in his father's shop. Like Giovanni Battista, his independent work is extremely rare. Giacinto had a son, Antonio, who is recorded as a luthier, however his work is unknown.
- Vincenzo Rugeri (b. 30 September 1663; d. 4 May 1719) was the third, and most well known son of Francesco Rugeri. Vincenzo enjoyed considerable fortune as an independent violin maker and was possibly the finest craftsman of the family. His violins advanced upon the models of his father, retaining the Grand Amati form but adapting a flatter arch inspired by Stradivari. Vincenzo's instruments, together with Francesco's, are the most sought after of the family. Vincenzo was the first teacher of Carlo Bergonzi.
- Carlo Rugeri (b. 1666; d. 1713) He was Francesco's youngest son. Although he inherited all of Francesco's tools relating to the making of "violins, guitars, violoni and calascioni" as indicated in Francesco's codicil, Carlo does not appear to have been involved significantly with the family's violin shop, based upon the fact that there are hardly any examples of his work. He may have pursued another vocation.
