= Giuseppe Giovanni Battista Guarneri =

Italian luthier (1666–1740)

Giuseppe Guarneri ‘filius Andreae’
- Born: Giovanni Battista Giuseppe Guarneri; 25 November 1666; Cremona
- Died: 1740 (aged 73–74)
- Known for: Luthier
- Style: Guarnerius style; Amati style; Gasparo da Salò style
- Movement: Cremonese school
- Spouse: Barbara Franchi (m. 1690; died 1737)
- Children: Pietro Guarneri; Bartolomeo Giuseppe Guarneri 'del Gesù'
- Father: Andrea Guarneri

Giuseppe Giovanni Battista Guarneri, better known as Giuseppe filius Andrea Guarneri (25 November 1666 – c. 1739/1740) was a violin maker from the prominent Guarneri family of luthiers who lived in Cremona, Italy.

== Biography ==
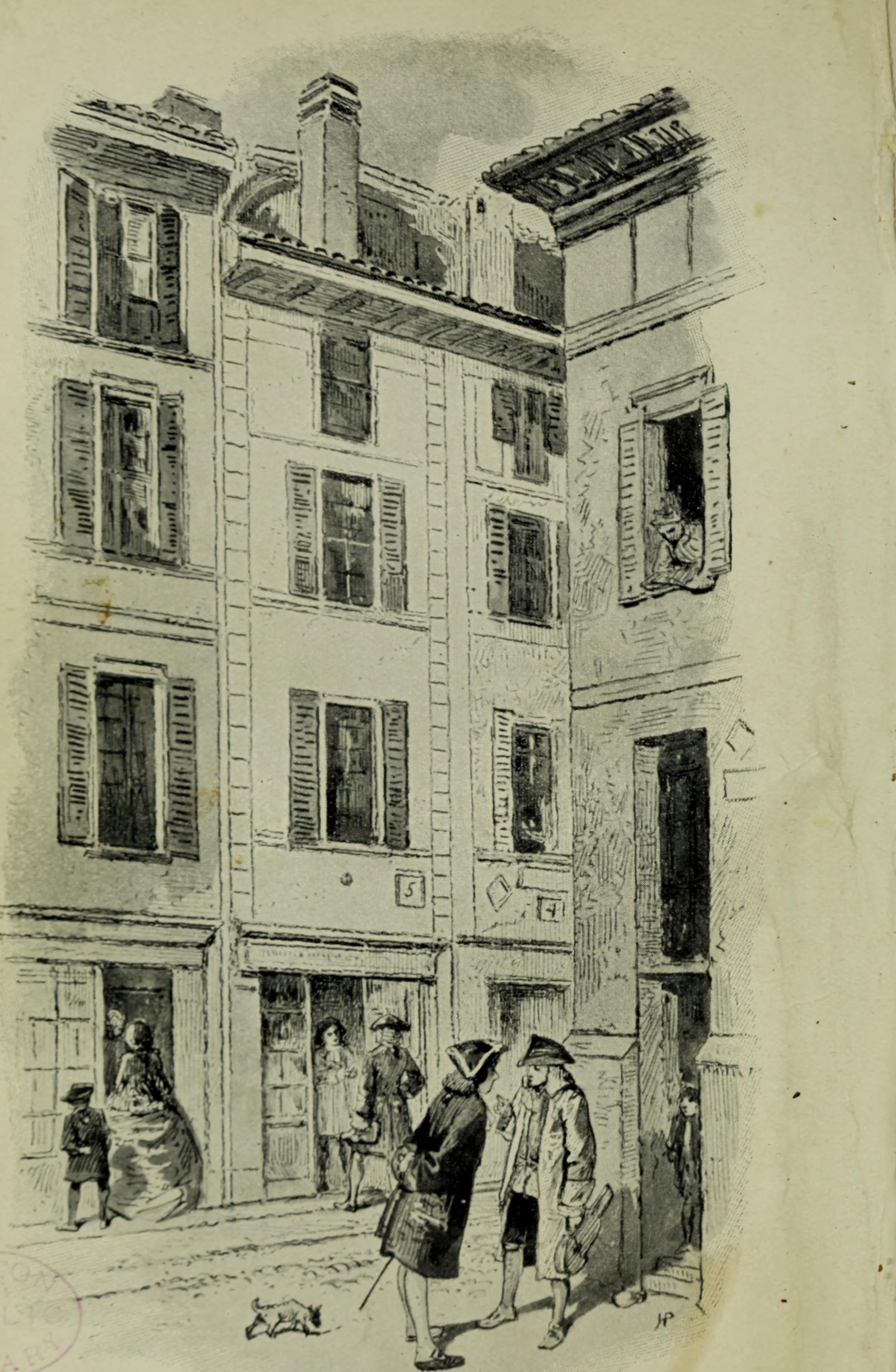
Illustration in book about Casa Guarneri (1906)

=== Early life ===
Giovanni Battista Giuseppe Guarneri (known as Giuseppe ‘filius Andreae’) was born on November 25, 1666, to Andrea Guarneri and Anna Maria Orcelli, in the parish of San Matteo in Cremona. A few years earlier his father had left the workshop of Nicolò Amati. Giuseppe, also known as "Joseph Guarnerius, filius Andreæ" (in Latin) was the younger son of Andrea Guarneri. Giuseppe's older brother, Pietro Giovanni Guarneri (Pietro I, b. 1655; d. 1720), was a musician as well as a violinmaker.

=== Apprenticeship ===
In 1677, Pietro married Caterina Sussagni, but he continued to live in the family home. Young Giuseppe probably entered his father's workshop at this time. By 1685, Giuseppe's workmanship had surpassed their father's, and when Andrea died in 1698 Giuseppe took over the shop.

=== Competition with Stradivari ===
A promising young violin maker named Antonio Stradivari was emerging, who in 1680 moved his workshop to the Piazza San Domenico, just a few metres away from the Casa Guarneri. Because of this increasing local competition, by 1683, Pietro had moved to Mantua, leaving Giuseppe to work in their father's shop.

=== Marriage and family ===
In 1690, Giuseppe married young Barbara Franchi, a parishioner of Sant’ Agata, who then joined the Guarneri family in the house on Piazza San Domenico. In the meantime the health of Andrea seems to have further declined, thereby increasing his son's responsibility in the running of the family workshop.

Giuseppe's elder son Pietro (Pietro II, b. 1695; d. 1762), left Cremona and established his own workshop in Venice about 1718, becoming known as Pietro di Venezia ("Peter of Venice").

Giuseppe's younger son, Bartolomeo Giuseppe (b. 1698; d. 1744), became the most celebrated member of the dynasty. Because he used the letters I.H.S. on his labels, he became known as ‘del Gesù’. He was one of the greatest makers ever; many feel his instruments are better than Stradivari's. Del Gesù violins are renowned for their rich, powerful tone, and have been favoured by virtuosos from Paganini to Pinchas Zukerman.

=== War of the Spanish Succession ===
Cremona was by this time experiencing one of its most troubled periods. Involved in the War of Spanish Succession, the city was besieged by Austrian troops and was finally captured in the Battle of Cremona in 1702, when Prince Eugenio of Savoy, the commander of the Habsburg troops, stormed the city. Through all of this, Giuseppe continued his work.

=== Illness ===
Giuseppe's health had declined so much that in the parish of year 1730 he was absent because he was hospitalized. He was back at home by the time of the 1731, but was incapable of working. His son, Bartolomeo, who did not make violins for years, came back to Guarneri Workshop to help his father. Giuseppe continued to assist Bartolomeo, particularly in the carving of the heads between year 1731 and 1739.

=== Death ===
In the Easter of year 1740, Giuseppe ‘filius Andreae’ was no longer present in the family house. It is likely that he died in early 1740 in one of the city's seven hospitals. It is nevertheless strange that he was not buried in the family tomb in San Domenico – perhaps he died out of town or of a contagious disease.

== Instruments making ==
=== Amati style ===
Continued working in the Amatisé style of his father, Andrea, but latterly was influenced by his close neighbour Antonio Stradivari.

=== Guarnerius style ===
Around 1705, Giuseppe introduced a new violin model with a wider upper bout and a narrower middle bout that is distinctively squarish in shape. He also changed the soundholes from the short and sinuous Amati style to a longer and more rigid design. Giuseppe's design was influenced by Gasparo da Salo of Brescian School, and incorporated some of the stylistic refinements of his older brother (Peter of Mantua); the outline tended to be more narrow waisted, the f-holes were lower and more elegant, and he used a richer, more Brescian varnish. This pursuit of excellence continued into the next generation. and perfected by Giuseppe's son, Bartolomeo Giuseppe.

Giuseppe was once thought to be the teacher of Carlo Bergonzi, however it is now known that Bergonzi was a pupil of Vincenzo Rugeri.

=== Notable violins ===
A violin that Giuseppe created in 1706 became the subject of media attention in the 21st century. In 2016, a German commission recommended that the Franz Hofmann and Sophie Hagemann Foundation, which owns the violin, pay compensation to the heirs of a German Jewish man who had owned it in 1939 before committing suicide. In 2021 it was reported that the foundation was refusing to pay, which some observers noted could damage the credibility of future restitution efforts.

== Giuseppe filius Andrea's label ==
Typical Giuseppe Guarneri label.

Joseph Guarnerius, filius Andreæ
fecit Cremonse, sub titulo S. Teresiae, 16XX

Translation: Joseph Guarnerius, son of Andrea made this in Cremona, under the title of Saint Theresa, 16XX

== Notes ==
=== Sources ===
- Hill, William Henry (1932). The Violin Makers of the Guarneri Family: Their Life and Work. London: W.E. Hill & Sons. OCLC 23741230.
- Fushi, Geoffrey. The 'Vieuxtemps' Giuseppe Giovanni Battista Guarneri del Gesù. Chicago: Bein & Fushi Inc.
