= Guarneri =

Family of distinguished Italian luthiers

The Guarneri (/ɡwɑːrˈnɛəri/, UK also /-ˈnɪər-/, Italian: [ɡwarˈnɛːri]), often referred to in the Latinized form Guarnerius, is the family name of a group of distinguished luthiers from Cremona in Italy in the 17th and 18th centuries, whose standing is considered comparable to those of the Amati and Stradivari families.

== Family members ==
- Andrea Guarneri (c. 1626 – 7 December 1698) was an apprentice in the workshop of Nicolò Amati from 1641 to 1646 and returned to make violins for Amati from 1650 to 1654. His early instruments are generally based on the "Grand Amati" pattern but struggled to achieve the sophistication of Amati's own instruments. Andrea Guarneri produced some fine violas. The ex-Primrose Viola, which was played by William Primrose, bears Andrea's label but may have been made by his son Giuseppe.

Two of Andrea's sons continued the father's traditions:

- Pietro Giovanni Guarneri (Pietro da Mantova) (18 February 1655 – 26 March 1720) worked in his father's workshop from around 1670 until his marriage in 1677. He was established in Mantua by 1683, where he worked both as a musician and a violin maker. His instruments are generally finer than his father's, but are rare owing to his double profession. Joseph Szigeti played one of his instruments.
- Giuseppe Giovanni Battista Guarneri (filius Andreae) (25 November 1666 – 1739 or 1740), Andrea's younger son, joined his father's business in Cremona, inheriting it in 1698. He is reckoned among the great violin makers, although he struggled to compete with Stradivari, a pervasive presence throughout his career. From around 1715 he was assisted by his sons, and probably Carlo Bergonzi.

Giuseppe Giovanni Battista was father to two further instrument makers:

- Pietro Guarneri (Pietro da Venezia) (14 April 1695 – 7 April 1762), finding life in Casa Guarneri in some way uncongenial, left Cremona for good in 1718, eventually settling in Venice. Here he blended the Cremonese techniques of his father with Venetian, perhaps working with Domenico Montagnana and Carlo Annibale Tononi. His first original labels from Venice date from 1730. His instruments are rare and as highly prized as those of his father and uncle. One of his cellos was played by Beatrice Harrison.
- Bartolomeo Giuseppe Guarneri (del Gesù) (21 August 1698 – 17 October 1744) has been called the greatest violinmaker of all time.
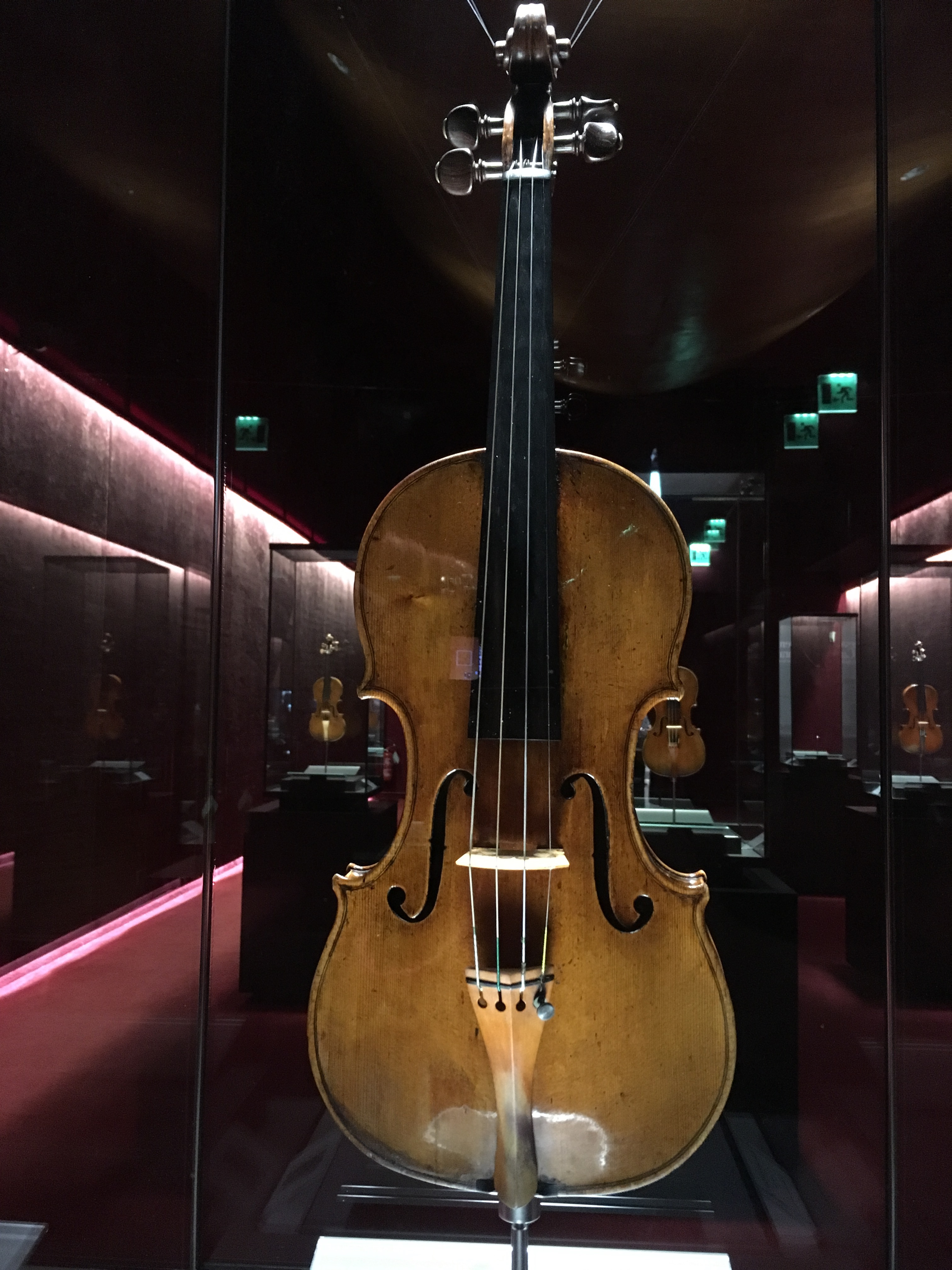
  A 1734 Guarneri del Gesu violin
  Giuseppe is known as del Gesù ("of Jesus") because his labels always incorporated the characters I.H.S. (iota eta sigma, a Greek acronym known as the Christogram). His instruments deviated significantly from family tradition, becoming uniquely his own style, and are considered second in quality only to those of Stradivari and argued by some to be superior. The famed violin virtuoso Niccolò Paganini’s favorite instrument Il Cannone Guarnerius was a Guarneri del Gesù violin of 1743. The Lord Wilton Guarneri del Gesù violin made in 1742 was owned by Yehudi Menuhin. His last work is believed to be Ole Bull, a Guarneri del Gesù violin of 1744.

Other 20th-century 'del Gesù' players include Arthur Grumiaux, Jascha Heifetz, Leonid Kogan, Kyung Wha Chung, Michael Rabin, Joseph Silverstein, Isaac Stern, Pinchas Zukerman, Charles Fleischman, Robert McDuffie, Itzhak Perlman, Midori Goto, Rachel Barton Pine, Henryk Szeryng, Sarah Chang, Leila Josefowicz and the late Eugene Fodor.

The Guarneri family's history is partially uncertain. Anthony J. Guarnieri writes, "Giuseppe del Gesù and Peter of Venice may have been cousins rather than brothers, and Peter of Venice may have been the son of Peter of Mantua."

"Signor Giovanni de Piccolellis, in 1885, searched the archives at the church, San Donato, in Cremona for information on the Guarneri family. His findings, published 1886, in the manuscript entitled "LIUTAI ANTICHI e MODERNI", and now available online in PDF format on Google Books clearly shows that Joseph Guarneri 'del Gesù' was the son of Gian Battista Guarneri, who was in fact the younger brother of Andrea Guarneri."

== Guarneri violins ==
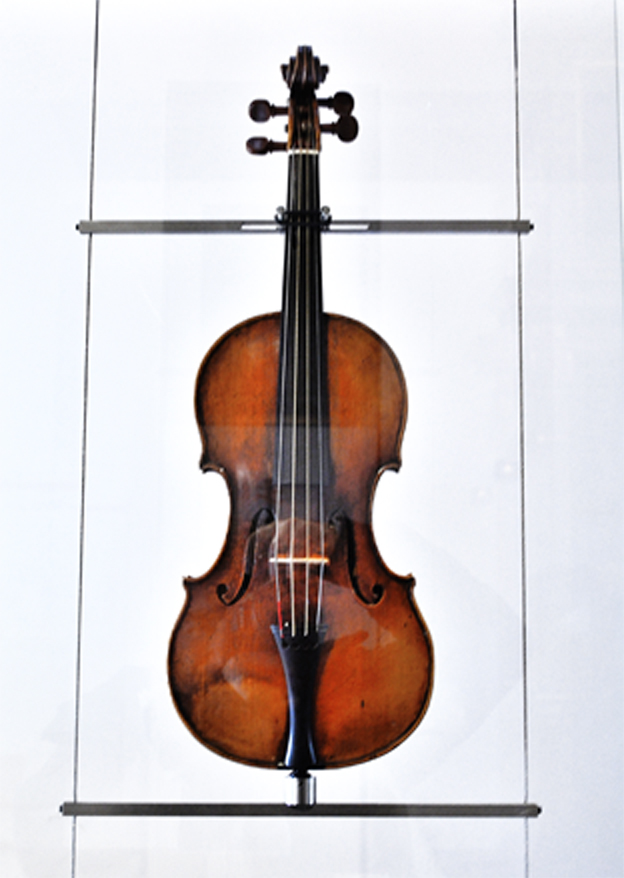
Paganini's Cannone by Guarneri

Some of the world's most famous violinists, such as Niccolò Paganini, Jascha Heifetz and Yehudi Menuhin have preferred Guarneris to Stradivaris. The average Stradivari is stronger in the 200 Hz and 250 Hz bands and above 1.6 kHz. Guarneri violins are also known by the extension of Giuseppe Guarneri's name, Del Gesù. Del Gesùs are on average stronger from 315 Hz up to 1.25 kHz. These differences are perceived as a more brilliant sound and stronger fundamentals of the lowest notes of the Stradivari, versus a darker sound in the del Gesùs.

A Guarneri violin is a center object in one of Andrea Camilleri's main Montalbano novels La Voce del violino ("The voice of the violin").

In the summer of 2010, the ex-Vieuxtemps Guarneri del Gesù, a violin built in 1741 by Bartolomeo Giuseppe Guarneri, was offered for sale at auction with a starting bid of $18 million, the highest price ever sought for a musical instrument. The violin was later sold for an undisclosed sum and Anne Akiko Meyers was given lifetime use.

== Bibliography ==
- Vannes, Rene (1985) [1951]. Dictionnaire Universel del Luthiers. Vol. 3. Bruxelles: Les Amis de la musique. OCLC 53749830.
- William, Henley (1969). Universal Dictionary of Violin & Bow Makers. Brighton; England: Amati. ISBN 0-901424-00-5.
- Walter Hamma, Meister Italienischer Geigenbaukunst, Wilhelmshaven 1993, ISBN 3-7959-0537-0
- The Violin Makers of the Guarneri family, Their Life and Work - W.E. Hill & Sons, London, 1931

== Fiction ==
- Green, Albert Wingate. Sunset in Cremona: A Fanciful Tale; Begin the Romance of Joseph Guarnerius. Ann Arbor: Edwards Bros, 1954.
- Wibberley, Leonard. Guarneri: Story of a Genius. New York: Farrar, Straus, Giroux, 1974. A fictionalized biography of the Italian violin maker whose instruments, unappreciated in his lifetime, were deemed among the greatest many years after his death. ISBN 9780374328221.
- Kilroy, Claire. Tenderwire: An Irish female violinist engages with shady characters in NYC on a hunt for what may or may not be a Del Gesù violin. ISBN 9780571229758
- Captain Jack Aubrey, the main character in Patrick O'Brian's Master and Commander series of historical novels purchases a Guarneri violin with prize money won at sea. It appears in a number of the books in the series.
