= Aleksandra Unkovskaya =

Russian violinist and music educator (1857–1927)

Aleksandra Vasilievna Unkovskaya (Russian: Александра Васильевна Унковская; born Zakharina; 1857–1927) was a Russian violinist and music educator. She graduated from the Saint Petersburg Conservatory with a gold medal in the violin class of Professor Leopold Auer.

== Biography ==
Aleksandra Unkovskaya was a professional violinist. Nikolai Alexandrovich Galler (Russian: Галлер), a family friend and bank director, presented her with a violin made by Giuseppe Guarneri del Gesù in 1742. Galler also gifted her sister Sonya the 1872 "St. Nicolas" violin made by Jean-Baptiste Vuillaume.

In her memoirs, Unkovskaya credited her musical development to her family's home soirées, attending performances at the Mariinsky Theatre, her acquaintance with the composers Mily Balakirev and Alexander Serov, and violin lessons with Leopold Auer beginning in 1871.

After graduating, Unkovskaya married Nikolai Vladimirovich Unkovsky (1856–1904), a member of the hereditary noble Unkovsky family of the Saint Petersburg region, a naval officer who later became a highly successful opera singer (dramatic baritone), producer, entrepreneur, and teacher. They had three children: Vladimir (1880–1951), Sergey (1881–1931) and Nikolai (1895–1942).

The Unkovsky family were hereditary nobles of the Saint Petersburg region.

== Married life ==
In 1880, her husband retired from his military career with the rank of captain lieutenant, and they moved to the city of Penza, where they pursued their music careers. From 1887 to 1890, he sang at the St. Petersburg Mariinsky Theatre, and then organized a musical and drama troupe, the "Association of Opera Artists," which toured cities in the Volga region and central and southern Russia. The conductor of the opera performances was his wife Aleksandra Vasilievna Zakharyina-Unkovskaya. The company's repertoire included Eugene Onegin, The Queen of Spades, The Demon, Faust, Il trovatore, Aida, Pagliacci, Un ballo in maschera, and Lohengrin. N. V. Unkovsky sang the roles of the Demon and Amonasro in Aida.

In the seasons of 1893, 1894, and 1898, the Unkovsky troupe performed in Kaluga (100 miles southwest of Moscow) where they decided to settle. In Kaluga, Aleksandra Vasilievna became active as a violin and vocal teacher at the private school of F. M. Shakhmagonov. After the death of her famous operatic husband in the summer of 1904, Aleksandra Vasilievna focused on the synesthesia of sound and colour, which she interpreted in mystical terms. She had been aware of this ability from an early age and had devoted herself to teaching it since the late 19th century. This phenomenon, known as chromesthesia, involves the involuntary experience of colour, shape, and movement in response to sound.

Unkovskaya developed a system of musical education based on the relationships between colour, sound, and number, and published it as The Method of Colors, Sounds and Numbers (c.1915–16), for which she reportedly received an award from the Milan Conservatory. She also lectured and wrote in the spirit of Theosophical ideas about sound, colour and music. She actively participated in the publication of "Herald of Theosophy". On April 21, 1909, a department of the Russian Theosophical Society was opened in Kaluga, of which she was a founding member. Traveling frequently, she had extensive contacts with European theosophists and was acquainted with many prominent figures in the world of music and art.

In 1909, Wassily Kandinsky attended a presentation by Unkovskaya at the Theosophical Congress in Budapest on her colour-sound-number system. According to her memoirs, Kandinsky wrote of her method that she had developed a means of translating the colours of nature into music and of painting the sounds of nature.

Her three sons were later subjected to Soviet political repressions.

== Unkovsky's children ==
Vladimir Nikolaevich Unkovsky (1880–1951) graduated from a military school on August 10, 1904, after which he was promoted to second lieutenant. As part of the Siberian Rifle Regiment, he participated in the Russo-Japanese War. He was wounded during the fighting in North Korea in 1905. In 1921–1929, he served in the provincial land department, holding minor positions. When doubts arose about his loyalty due to non-proletarian origin (as a hereditary noble), Vladimir Nikolaevich left for Turkmenistan. In 1929–1930, served as a technician in the water management of the Turkmen SSR. In 1930–1931, he was the head of survey parties and foreman at the construction of irrigation facilities of the Turkmen SSR, taught foreman courses.

Sergei Nikolaevich Unkovsky (1881–1931) graduated from the Naval Cadet Corps in 1903, and participated in three wars: Russo-Japanese War (1904–1905), World War I (1914–1918) and the Civil War (1918–1921). In 1922 he was appointed Head of the Marine Fleet Administration in Sevastopol and Acting Head of the Navigation Safety Administration of the Black and Azov Seas under the command of M. V. Frunze, with whom he was well acquainted. On November 23, 1930, he was arrested. On April 8, 1931, he committed suicide in prison. According to sources he died because he was unable to withstand the conditions of detention.

Nikolai Nikolaevich Unkovsky (1895–1942) was a naval Captain (2nd rank) in the Caspian Sea Fleet. On July 15, 1938, he was arrested by order of a non-judicial body "for participation in an anti-Soviet terrorist organization" and imprisoned for 5 years in labor camps. At the end of his term, he was again condemned by the Special Meeting of the NKVD of the USSR (Decree of August 22, 1942). The case on charges of Nikolay Nikolayevich Unkovsky was reviewed by the Military Collegium of the Supreme Court of the Soviet Union on March 14, 1955, and was declared a victim of political repressions and 'was rehabilitated'. According to unverified reports, his relatives received news that he, being very ill, died in 1942 on his way home.

== Vasilievna's violin ==
According to accounts published in The Strad (2023), after Unkovskaya's death in 1927 her violin was taken into state custody as a rare instrument of museum quality. Nevertheless, Russian violinist Mikhail Borisovich Reison mentions in his memoir that Aleksandra Vasilevna Unkovskaya had previously gifted her Del Gesu to him, and that it was confiscated by the Russian State into its collection.

The provenance of the 1742 Guarneri Del Gesu: Jean-Baptiste Vuillaume, Nikolai Alexandrovich Haller, Aleksandra Zakharina-Unkovskaya, Mikhail Reison, Russian State Collection (since 1929–30).
