= Carlo Annibale Tononi =

Italian luthier (1675–1730)

Carlo Annibale Tononi (1675–1730) was a luthier who trained and worked with his father, Johannes Tononi, in the family workshop in Bologna, Papal States, until Johannes (born circa 1640) died in 1713. After his father's death, Tononi moved to the more important center of music in Italy, Venice.

In the late 17th century, Bologna was a great centre for art and especially of string playing, being Arcangelo Corelli's home town. By the early 18th century, Venice had become a more important cultural centre (for music and lutherie and instrument making). Carlo Tononi moved to Venice between 1713 and 1716, where he became one of the foremost makers of the new Venetian School.

Before his death, Tononi modified his will to provide for his funeral. He requested that the proceeds from the sale of one of his cellos be used to pay for a mass to be said for his soul. On 21 April 1730, his executors published his will after his death; Carlo's elder brother, Felice (also a luthier, particularly noted for his 'cellos), was the main beneficiary.

A genuine Tononi violin ranges in value from $45,000 to $450,000 depending on condition and provenance.
