= House of Moroni =

Italian noble family

Moroni Morù, Morone
- Country: Italy
- Current region: Bergamo
- Founded: 1156
- Founder: Joannis Moroni
- Members: Andrea Moroni; Giovanni Morone; Dado Moroni; Gaetano Moroni; Giovanni Battista Moroni; Antonio Stradivari
- Connected families: Celsi
- Estate: Palazzo Moroni

The Moroni family (sometimes "Morone") was a moderately powerful noble family in Italy. Their Baroque Palazzo Moroni in Bergamo is a tourist attraction. The origin of the family is believed to date back to the ancient Venetian Celsi family, who later moved to Milan and the Bergamo area.

== See also ==
- Template:Antonio Stradivari family
