= Purfling =

Decorative inlaid strip on stringed instruments

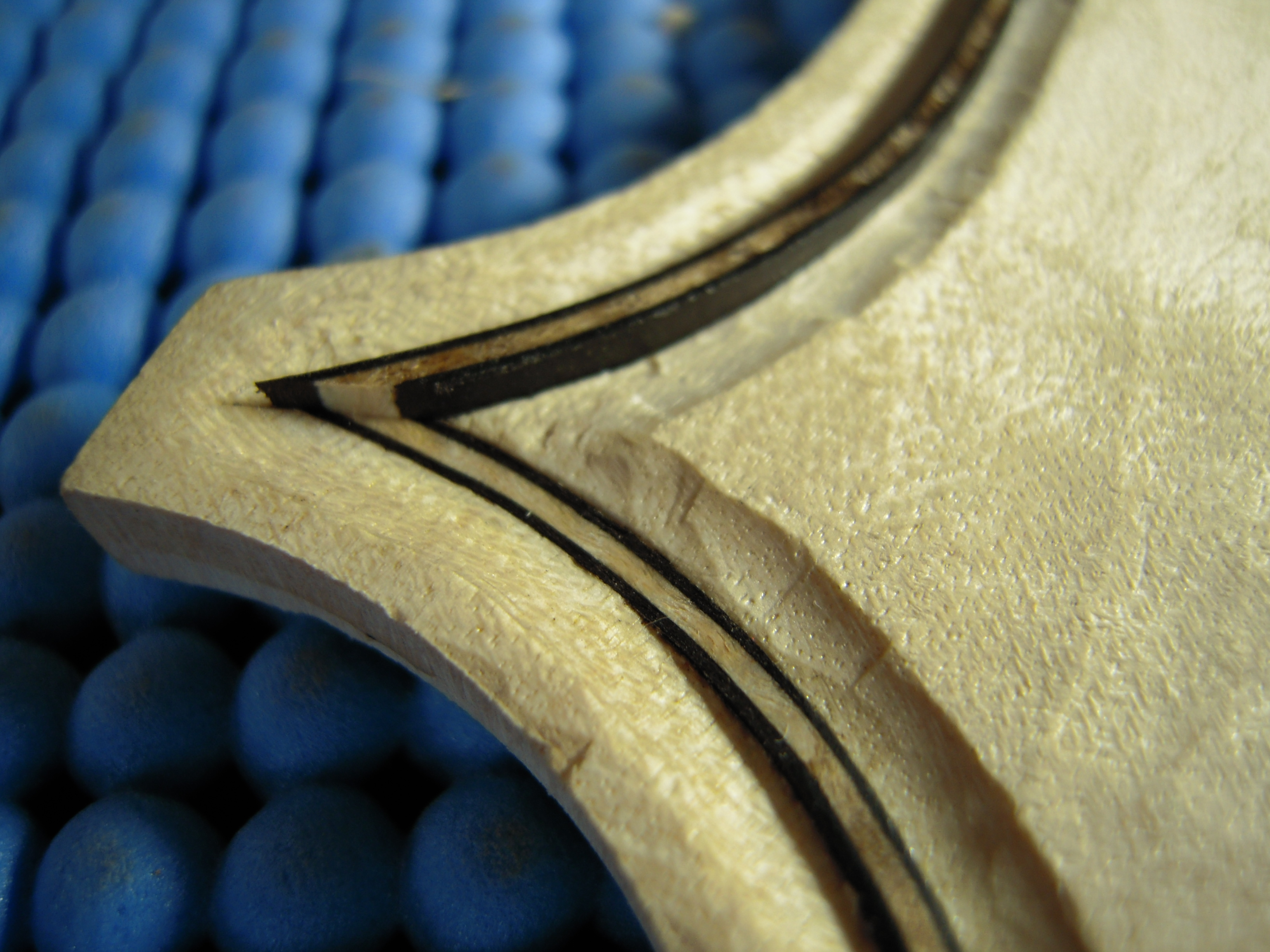
Gluing in purfling on the cello's back plate.

Purfling is a narrow decorative edge inlaid into the top plate and often the back plate of a stringed instrument. It was originally made of laminated strips of wood, and later nacre and other hard inlay materials. Plastic is commonly used in modern mass-produced instruments. Purfling may affect the instrument's acoustics.

Purfling is distinct from binding, which is used primarily to control moisture rather than decoration. Inexpensive instruments may simulate purfling with paint.

== Description and history ==
Purfling is a narrow decorative edge inlaid into the top plate and often the back plate of a stringed instrument. Purfling was originally made of laminated strips of wood, often contrasting in color as a visual accent. The earliest known example of purfling is on a violin made by Andrea Amati in 1564, now on display in the Ashmolean Museum at Oxford University. It consists of two outer strips of pearwood stained black and an inner strip of poplar.

Eventually, nacre from shell, usually mother of pearl or abalone, and other hard inlay materials were incorporated to provide highly decorative effects. Elaborate inlay is found most often on fretted instruments. Laminates and composites made from nacreous shell and synthetic materials, described as "fake", "faux", or "shin paua", are sometimes used by luthiers.

Today, plastic purfling is commonplace in mass-produced instruments. One common example of plastic purfling is a sandwich of three alternating strips of black and white, measuring about 1.25 mm × 2.00 mm (3/64 in × 5/64 in). However, many distinctive variations are used.

== Acoustics ==
The channel cut for the inlay of purfling may increase the flexibility of the plates where they join the sides, affecting an instrument's pitch and sustain. In cases of heavy decorative inlay, the effective vibrational area of the sound board may be reduced.

== Related techniques ==
=== Binding ===
Binding is a narrow outer strip of material on the edges of the body of stringed instruments such as lutes, mandolins, guitars and ukuleles. Binding may be made of thin wood strips. It is applied along the entire edge of top and back plates. While it can provide a decorative function, the primary purpose of binding is to block the transfer of moisture by the hygroscopic end grain of the plates of the instrument. This prevents cracks in a way that purfling cannot. It also reduces wear to instrument body edges. Hardwood, fruitwood, plastics and other synthetic materials are commonly used to make bindings.

Binding may be used along the sides of fingerboards of fretted instruments. It softens the feel of the neck as one's fretting hand slides past the thin metal ends of fret wire, and it provides decorative appeal.

=== Painting ===
Inexpensive instruments may have no purfling and instead produce a similar decorative effect with paint.
