= List of luthiers =

This is a short list of some significant Luthiers.

== 15th – 19th centuries ==
- Anonimous 1495
- Andrea Amati
- Nicolò Amati
- Antonio Amati & Girolamo Amati
- Tommaso Balestrieri
- Carlo Bergonzi
- Camillo Camilli
- Goffredo Cappa
- Enrico Ceruti
- Giovanni Battista Ceruti
- Georges Chanot III
- Charles Jean Baptiste Collin-Mezin
- José Contreras
- Giovan Giacomo Dalla Corna
- Gasparo Duiffopruggar
- Richard Duke
- Joan Maria da Bressa
- Charles François Gand
- Gasparo da Salò
- Gagliano family of luthiers
- August Gemünder
- George Gemünder
- Francesco Goffriller
- Matteo Goffriller
- Gianbattista Grancino
- Giovanni Grancino
- Paolo Grancino
- Giovanni Battista Guadagnini
- Andrea Guarneri
- Giuseppe Guarneri del Gesu
- Giuseppe Giovanni Battista Guarneri
- Pietro Guarneri
- Pietro Giovanni Guarneri
- Martin Hoffmann
- Klotz
- Johann Kulik
- René François Lacôte
- Carlo Ferdinando Landolfi
- Nicolas Lupot
- Giovanni Paolo Maggini
- Christian Frederick Martin
- Charles Mennégand
- Zanetto Micheli
- Pellegrino Micheli
- Domenico Montagnana
- Samuel Nemessányi
- Barak Norman
- Vincenzo Panormo
- Andrea Postacchini
- Abraham Prescott
- Giovanni Francesco Pressenda
- Jacob Rayman
- Giuseppe Rocca
- Giovanni Battista Rogeri
- Francesco Rugeri
- Vincenzo Rugeri
- Matteo Sellas
- Santo Serafin
- Valentino Siani
- Jacob Stainer
- Johann Georg Stauffer
- Lorenzo Storioni
- Antonio Stradivari
- Simon Straub
- David Tecchler
- Carlo Antonio Testore
- Carlo Giuseppe Testore
- Paolo Antonio Testore
- Tieffenbrucker
- Carlo Annibale Tononi
- Jean-Baptiste Vuillaume
- Nicolas François Vuillaume
- Leopold Widhalm
- Matteo Sellas

== 20th century ==
- Franco Albanelli
- Gaetano Antoniazzi
- Riccardo Antoniazzi
- Romeo Antoniazzi
- Jenny Bailly
- Paolo de Barbieri
- Otello Bignami
- John Birch
- Leandro Bisiach
- Carlo Bisiach
- Terry Borman
- Rodolfo Camacho Viera
- Marino Capicchioni
- Charles Collin-Mezin, Jr.
- John D'Angelico
- Jimmy D'Aquisto
- Domingo Esteso
- Annibale Fagnola
- Gerundino Fernández
- Giuseppe Fiorini
- Raffaele Fiorini
- Russell de Gree Flagg
- Ignacio Fleta
- Ferdinando Garimberti
- Orville Gibson
- Johann Goldfuß
- Hermann Hauser Sr.
- Heinrich Th Heberlein Jr.
- John Juzek
- Marc Laberte
- Giuseppe Bernardo Lecchi
- Silvio de Lellis
- Lloyd Loar
- Louis Lowenthal
- Mario Maccaferri
- Andy Manson
- Nodu Mullick
- Giuseppe Ornati
- Manouk Papazian
- George Peacock
- Ansaldo Poggi
- Giuseppe Pedrazzini
- Sergio Peresson
- José Ramírez
- José Ramírez III
- Manuel Ramírez
- Sesto Rocchi
- Hiren Roy
- Ernst Heinrich Roth
- Simone Fernando Sacconi
- Igino Sderci
- Gaetano and Pietro Sgarabotto
- Stefano Scarampella
- Jerome Bonaparte Squier
- Antonio de Torres
- Emmanuel Venious (Manol)
- José Yacopi

== Contemporary ==
- Robert Benedetto
- Riccardo Bergonzi
- Terry Borman
- Dana Bourgeois
- Wilhelm Brückner
- Scott Cao
- Meredith Coloma
- Douglas Cox
- John Cruz
- William R. Cumpiano
- Jo Dusepo
- Jim Fleeting
- Vasile Gliga
- Horst Goldfuß
- Gilberto Grácio
- Emmanuel Gradoux-Matt
- Stefan-Peter Greiner
- David Harvey
- Wayne Henderson
- Alois Honek
- Loeiz Honoré
- Grover Jackson
- Timothy J. Jansma
- Florian Leonhard
- Linda Manzer
- Andy Manson
- Stephan Marchione
- Sergio Peresson
- Roberto Regazzi
- Steve Ripley
- Andrea Tacchi
- Jim Triggs
- Rick Turner
- Emily Alice Shaw
- Paul Reed Smith
- Ervin Somogyi
- Nobuhiro Sonoda
- Gary Southwell
- Faruk Türünz
- Dean Zelinsky
- Tony Zemaitis
- Samuel Zygmuntowicz
- Greg Smallman
- Paul Languedoc
- Piotr Pielaszek

== Experimental luthiers ==
- Ivor Darreg
- Ellen Fullman
- Eli Gras
- Yuri Landman
- Joseph Nagyvary
- Harry Partch
- Bradford Reed
- Hans Reichel
