= John Cruz =

John Cruz may refer to:

- John A. Cruz (born 1954), Guamanian politician
- John F. Cruz, American politician
- John Lloyd Cruz (born 1983), Filipino actor
- John Cruz (luthier) American guitar builder
- John Fred Cruz (born 1957), American technologist and actor
