= Johann Goldfuß =

Johann Goldfuss
- Born: 11 December 1908; Skalná, Austria-Hungary
- Died: 3 July 1970 (aged 61); Schwandorf, West Germany
- Occupation: Luthier

Johann Goldfuss (11 December 1908, Skalná – 3 July 1970, Schwandorf) was a German luthier.

== Biography ==
Johann Goldfuss was born in Wildstein in Austria-Hungary (now Skalná, Czech Republic). He studied his craft with Mathias Heinicke, who was one of the main representatives of the school of luthiers of Saxony-Bohemia. Goldfuss worked with Heinicke for 17 years, becoming himself a master craftsman. His work was interrupted during World War II, when he was drafted and then taken prisoner of war.

When he was released, in 1949, he found out that his family had been expelled from Czechoslovakia and had moved to Schwandorf, Bavaria. He started his craft again, first repairing violins and eventually opened a new workshop for violins. His wife Katharina was able to go back to Czechoslovakia and to smuggle to his new homeland the tools which had been left behind. He built over 300 violins, violas and cellos which were known for the outstanding uniformity of their sounds.

Violin by Johann Goldfuss

He founded the "Geigenbau Goldfuss" company which specializes in the production of violins and string instruments which have gained recognition for their high quality and are used by violinists in concerts all over the world. Besides the production of string instruments, Johann Goldfuss is also known for his restoration of classical violins. He died of a heart attack on 3 July 1970.

The company founded by Johann Goldfuss was taken over by his son Horst Goldfuss (*1941) and has 1985 moved to Regensburg.

The company later was taken over by Thomas Goldfuss (*1966)
