= Terry Borman =

American violinmaker

Terry Borman is an American violinmaker who has been making violins in the United States for over 40 years. His training involved apprenticeships in various shops in France during the 1970s and 1980s. One of his apprenticeships was with the renowned Baroque instrument maker Stephen Murphy. He is also a graduate of the Prier Violin Making School of America in Salt Lake City, Utah. After 19 years of living in Utah, he moved to Fayetteville, Arkansas.

He quickly established himself as a maker by selling violins to such notable performers as Jaime Laredo and Pinchas Zukerman who have, over time, acquired multiple Borman instruments.

A short list of some well-known musicians who play instruments by Borman:

- Anne Akiko Meyers
- Kyung-wha Chung
- Pamela Frank
- Nicolas Kendall -Time for Three
- Jaime Laredo
- Cho-Liang Lin
- Sharon Robinson
- Joseph Silverstein
- Pinchas Zukerman

Borman was among only a handful of makers invited to show their instruments at both the 2006 and 2010 International Violin Competition of Indianapolis. These hands-on exhibitions highlighted the world's leading violin makers from Canada, France, Germany, and the United States. The exhibits provide rare opportunities to try violins by master makers of our time in one location.

He is very involved in scientific research to further the capabilities of the violin, specifically towards the needs of the violin in the 21st century. His research work is focused on the material properties of the wood used to create violins using densitometry and computer aided tomography (computed tomography). Additional research in the field of dendrochronology may yield exciting results as well. These topics of research may lead to a better understanding of the properties of historical instruments in order to more accurately reproduce their tonal qualities in modern instruments.

== Publications ==
- "The Strad" May 2018 "Part 1 - Unspoiled Charm: The Vieuxtemps Guarneri del Gesu"
- "The Strad" June 2018 "Part 2 - A Unique Pearl: The Vieuxtemps Guarneri del Gesu"
- "The Strad" January 2013 "Material Facts: A comparison of density in wood used by classical makers throughout Europe"
- "Public Library of Science" October 2012 "Wood Densitometry in 17th and 18th Century Dutch, German, Austrian and French Violins, Compared to Classical Cremonese and Modern Violins"
- The Strad, January 2011 CT and Modal Analysis of the Vieuxtemps Guarneri del Gesu
- "The VSA Papers" (Violin Society of America), Summer 2009 "Review of the Uses of Computed Tomography for Analyzing Instruments of the Violin Family with a Focus on the Future"
- "Public Library of Science", PLoSOne, July 2, 2008 "A Comparison of Wood Density between Classical Cremonese and Modern Violins"
- The Strad, September 2005 "Path Through the Woods, The Use of Medical Imaging in Examining Historical Instruments
- "The VSA Papers" (Violin Society of America) Summer 2005 "High Resolution Photography for Violin Makers"
