= Nobuhiro =

- Gender: Male

Origin
- Origin: Japanese
- Meaning: Different meanings depending on the kanji used

Nobuhiro (written: 信広, 信宏, 信尋, 信淵, 信弘, 信敬, 修宏, 修弘, 伸宏, 伸博, 伸洋, 敦弘, 敦彦, 暢彦, 順大, 順裕, 展裕, 伸啓, 宣浩, or 亘弘) is a masculine Japanese given name. Notable people with the name include:

- Nobuhiro Araki (荒城 信弘; born 1944), Japanese ice hockey player
- Nobuhiro Ishida (石田 順裕; born 1975), Japanese boxer
- Nobuhiro Ishizaki (石崎 信弘; born 1958), Japanese footballer and manager
- Nobuhiro Kato (加藤 順大; born 1984), Japanese footballer
- Nobuhiro Kawasato (川里 信弘), Japanese astronomer
- Nobuhiro Kiyotaki (清滝 信宏; born 1955), Japanese economist
- Konoe Nobuhiro (近衛 信尋; 1599–1649), Japanese kugyō
- Nobuhiro Maeda (前田 信弘; born 1973), Japanese footballer
- Nobuhiro Masuda (増田 伸洋; born 1973), Japanese golfer
- Nobuhiro Matsuda (松田 宣浩; born 1983), Japanese baseball player
- Nobuhiro Naito (内藤 修弘; born 1978), Japanese footballer
- Oda Nobuhiro (織田 信広; died 1574), Japanese daimyō
- Nobuhiro Ōkōchi (大河内 信敬; 1903–1967), Japanese painter
- Nobuhiro Omiya (近江屋 信広; born 1949), Japanese politician
- Nobuhiro Sadatomi (貞富 信宏; born 1979), Japanese footballer
- Satō Nobuhiro (佐藤 信淵; 1769–1850), Japanese scientist
- Nobuhiro Shiba (柴 暢彦; born 1974), Japanese footballer
- Nobuhiro Sonoda (born 1949), Japanese luthier
- Nobuhiro Suwa (諏訪 敦彦; born 1960), Japanese film director
- Nobuhiro Tajima (田嶋 伸博; born 1950), Japanese rally driver
- Takeda Nobuhiro (武田 信広; 1431–1494), Japanese samurai
- Nobuhiro Takeda (武田 修宏; born 1967), Japanese footballer
- Nobuhiro Takeda (born 1965) (武田 亘弘; born 1965), Japanese footballer
- Nobuhiro Tanabe (田辺 信宏; born 1961), Japanese politician
- Nobuhiro Tsurumaki (鶴巻 伸洋; born 1971), Japanese mixed martial artist
- Nobuhiro Ueno (上野 展裕; born 1965), Japanese footballer and manager
- Nobuhiro Watsuki (和月 伸宏; born 1970), Japanese manga artist
- Nobuhiro Yamashita (山下 敦弘; born 1976), Japanese film director
