= Martin Hoffmann =

Martin Hoffmann or Martin Hoffman may refer to:

== Spelled "Martin Hofmann" ==
- Martin Hofmann (born 1978), Czech actor

== Spelled "Martin Hoffmann" ==
- Martin Hoffmann (luthier) (1653–1719), German luthier
- Martin Hoffmann (footballer) (born 1955), German footballer and manager
- Martin Richard Hoffmann (1932–2014), United States Secretary of the Army 1975-77
- 9521 Martinhoffmann, an extraterrestrial minor planet

== Spelled "Martin Hoffman" ==
- Martin Hoffman, American psychology professor
- Martin Hoffman (painter), 18th-century German painter, known for his portrait of Linnaeus
- Martin Hoffman (bridge) (1929–2018), Czech-born British bridge player and writer
- Martin Hoffman, the writer of the music for the 1948 Woody Guthrie song "Deportee (Plane Wreck at Los Gatos)"
