= Gary Southwell =

Gary Southwell (born 14 February 1962) is a British musician-guitarist and luthier, specializing in guitars of Modern Classical and Romantic eras, resident in Northumberland.

== Biography ==
Gary Southwell studied lutherie under Herbert Schwartz at the London College of Furniture. He went on to build guitars for Julian Bream, Nigel North, Jakob Lindberg, Scott Tennant, David Starobin, David Tanenbaum, Frank Bungarten, Sting and Paul Simon.
