= Rodolfo Camacho Viera =

Argentine luthier

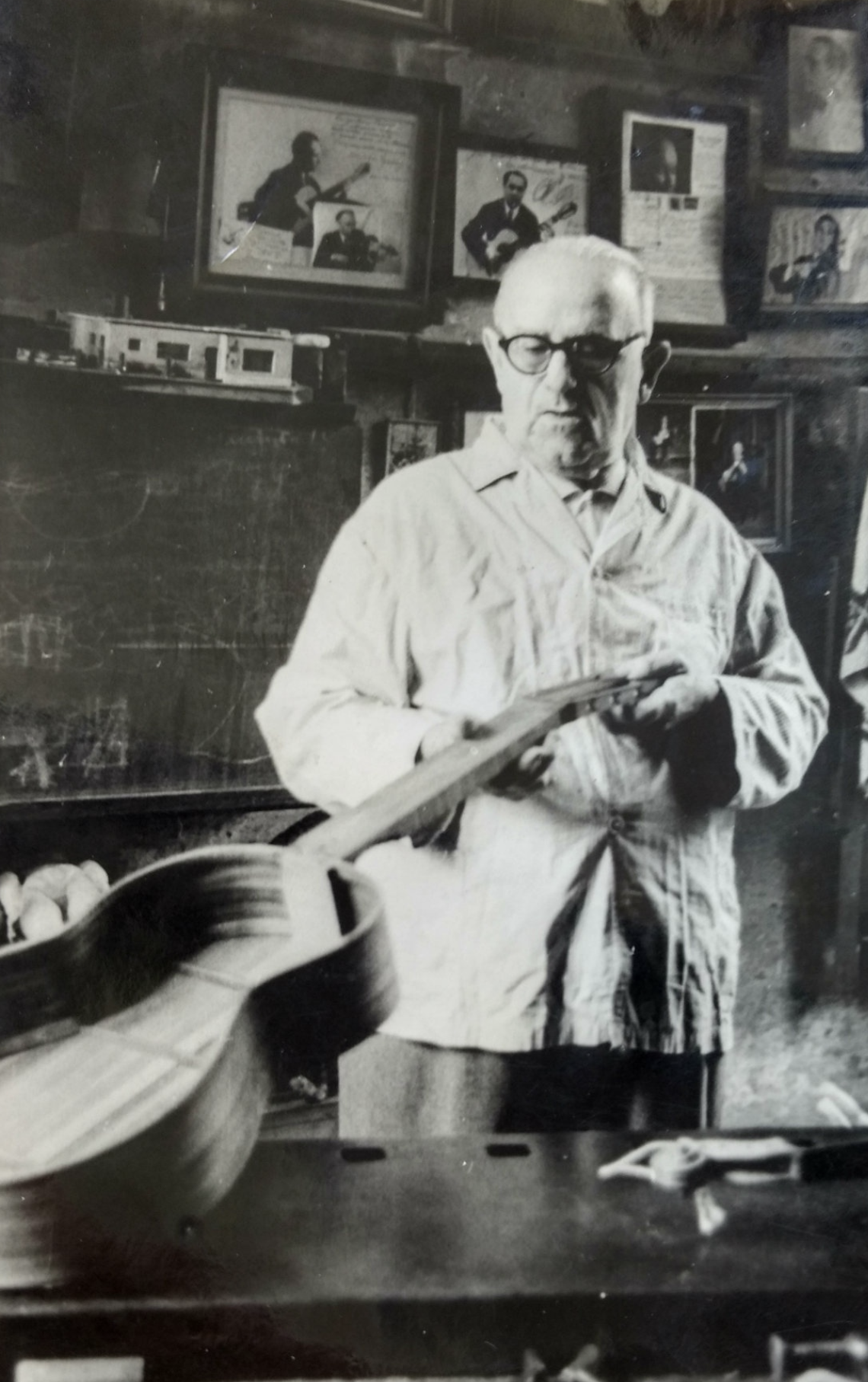
- Camacho Viera with one of his guitars
- Born: 10 March 1887; Montevideo, Uruguay
- Died: 1973 (aged 85–86); Buenos Aires, Argentina
- Occupation: Luthier

Rodolfo Camacho Viera (10 March 1887 – 1973) was a Uruguayan-born naturalized Argentine luthier, known for manufacturing classical guitars and violins. He is considered one of the most notable Latin American luthiers of his time, having received several awards. His guitars have been praised by musicians such as Andrés Segovia and Agustín Barrios.

== Biography ==
Rodolfo Camacho Viera was born in Montevideo, Uruguay, on 10 March 1887. His father was a guitar maker from Andalusia, Spain, who originally opened a workshop in the Canary Islands before moving with his family to Uruguay and then to Buenos Aires, where they settled in 1904. He learned the craft of luthiery from his father, and his guitars followed the Spanish tradition.

In Argentina, Camacho Viera began working for the National Congress of Argentina, doing carpentry work. Handcrafted pieces made by Camacho Viera still exist and can currently be seen in the Basilica of Our Lady of Luján. Later, he began specializing in guitar construction. As a luthier, he forged friendships and worked for renowned Latin American musicians such as Agustín Pío Barrios, Henryk Szeryng, Alirio Díaz, and Cayo Sila Godoy.

In 1934, guitarist Andrés Segovia spoke highly of Camacho Viera guitars:

I consider the guitar that has been made for me —not manufactured or constructed, which implies the abandonment of the artisan's spiritual care and resignation to mechanical elements— by Mr. Camacho Viera, the best instrument of all that have passed through my hands.

In addition to manufacturing guitars, Camacho Viera repaired musical instruments for wealthy families in Buenos Aires. In this way, he came into contact with Stradivarius violins and became interested in their construction. Through the study of these instruments, Camacho Viera created his own line of violins that are made in the style of Stradivarius.

Camacho Viera died in Buenos Aires, Argentina, in 1973.

== Awards ==
- Gold Medal (Barcelona, 1924)
- Gold Medal (Rome, 1924)
- First Prize and Gold Medal (Buenos Aires, 1928)

== Bibliography ==
- Herrera, Francisco (2004). Enciclopedia de la Guitarra (in Spanish). Piles. ISBN 9788495026798.
- Osborne, Randy; Martínez, Héctor García (2020). Annotations for the History of the Classical Guitar in Argentina, 1822-2000. Fine Fretted. ISBN 978-1-73452-940-1.
- Prat, Domingo (1986). A biographical, bibliographical, historical, critical dictionary of guitars (related instruments), guitarists (teachers, composers, performers, lutenists, amateurs), guitar-makers (luthiers), dances and songs, terminology (Repr. [of the] Buenos Aires, Romero y Fernandez, 1934 ed.). Columbus, Ohio: Ed. Orphée. ISBN 978-0-936186-18-4.
