= Andy Manson (luthier) =

Portugal-based luthier

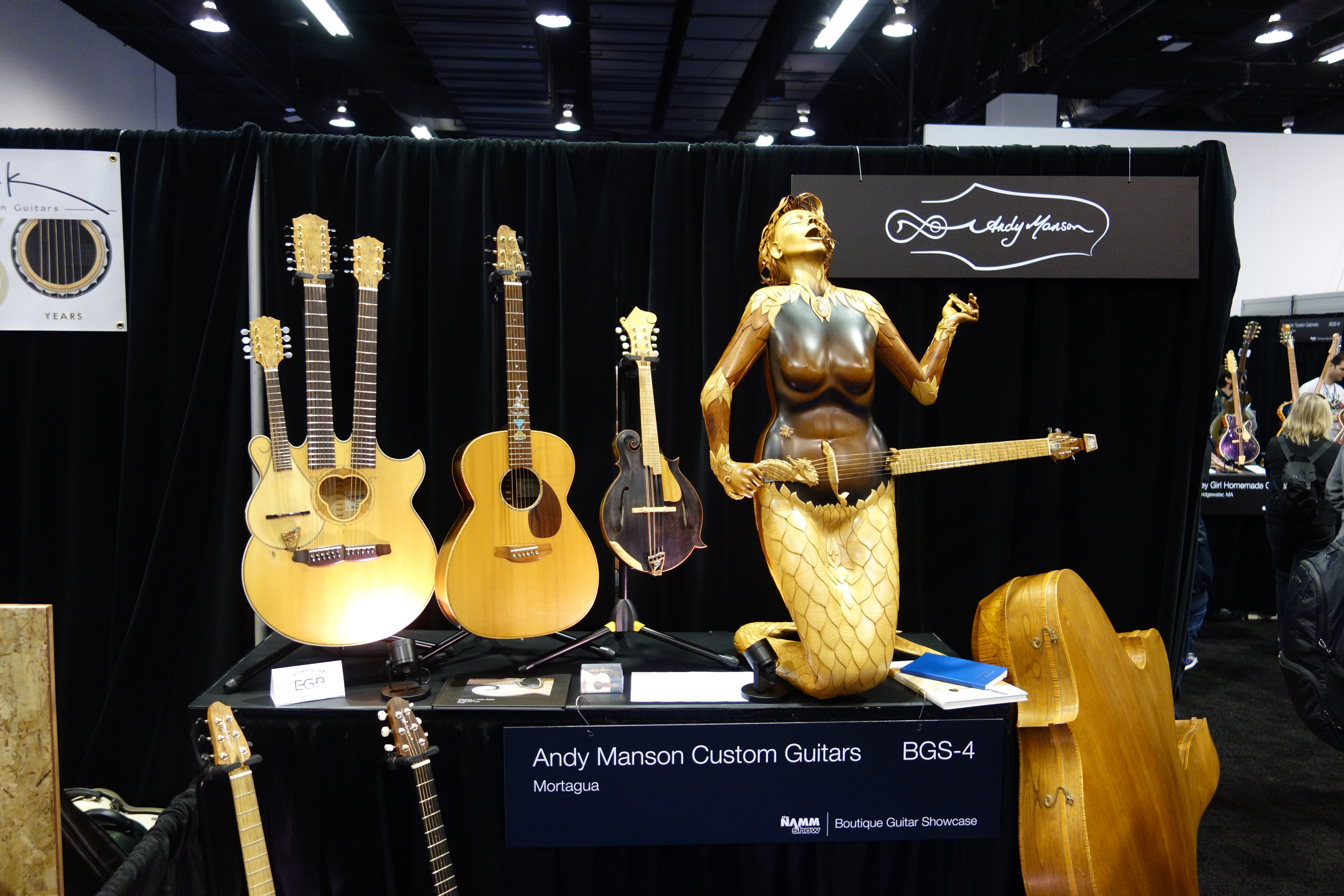
Andy Manson custom guitars (Mortágua, Portugal)

Andy Manson is a luthier who has been hand-crafting guitars and mandolins for over four decades. He became notorious for his flat-top and multi-necked acoustic-guitars and has influenced pieces by Hugh's & Brook Guitars, Elysian Acoustics and Gary Nava. On September 22nd, 2018, "The Guitar Barrel Project" was announced. Andy and other 5 luthiers would be working on their own unique guitars using wood that came from old wine barrels belonging to Marquês de Pombal.

== History ==
Manson studied at the London College of Furniture, completing a course based on the production of stringed-instruments. Such course of which was non-existent at the time - the college itself eventually encouraged Manson to create his own course tailored specifically to luthiering. Constructing his first instrument in 1967, Manson started a workshop dedicated to the process shortly after in 1969 in Sussex, UK.

In the early 1980s, Manson was joined by his brother, fellow luthier Hugh Manson, who focused on the production of electric/bass-guitars. The pair opened a shop together in Devon, England in 1985.

== Notable works ==
In 1974, Manson crafted an instrument for John Paul Jones of Led Zeppelin. It featured three necks: a six-string, twelve-string and mandolin. The instrument can be found featured within Led Zeppelin's acoustic sets throughout the mid to late 70's. The production of said instrument can be found detailed in Manson's book Talking Wood.

In 1994, Manson was commissioned to make another triple-neck guitar for Jimmy Page which was implemented during the Unledded performances.

== Notable clients ==
- Jimmy Page and John Paul Jones of Led Zeppelin
- Ian Anderson of Jethro Tull
- Andy Summers of The Police
- Mark Chadwick of the Levellers
- Dónal Lunny of Planxty and The Bothy Band
- Matthew Bellamy of Muse
