= Anonimous 1495 =

Anonimous 1495 is the name given to a luthier of the oldest Brescian school of violin making.

Anonimous 1495 is an anonymous maker of viols called "maestro delle viole" (viols master) in brescian archive documents, and was active in Brescia from probably 1485 to the beginning of 1500. From documents like the copyletter of Isabella d'Este marchioness of Mantua (Italy) we know that she visited his workshop and ordered three viols from him, and was so satisfied as to order another bigger one in 1499. Some scholars think that can be identified with the Gioan (Juan/Zuan) Maria da Bressa active later in Venice.
