= Louis Lowenthal =

German luthier

- Born: Königsberg
- Occupation: Violinmaker
- Instrument: Violin

Louis Lowenthal (Löwenthal, Lowendall, Lowendahl) (born 1836) was a luthier. He learned violin and bow making in Leipzig and Berlin. He founded his violin manufacturing business in Berlin, expanded into Dresden and eventually opened an American branch. That's where he anglicized his name to Lowendall.

Different grades of his instruments were sold in Sears Roebuck and Montgomery Ward catalogs in the early 1900s.
