= Emmanuel Venious =

Greek Ottoman luthier (1845–1915/16)

Manol
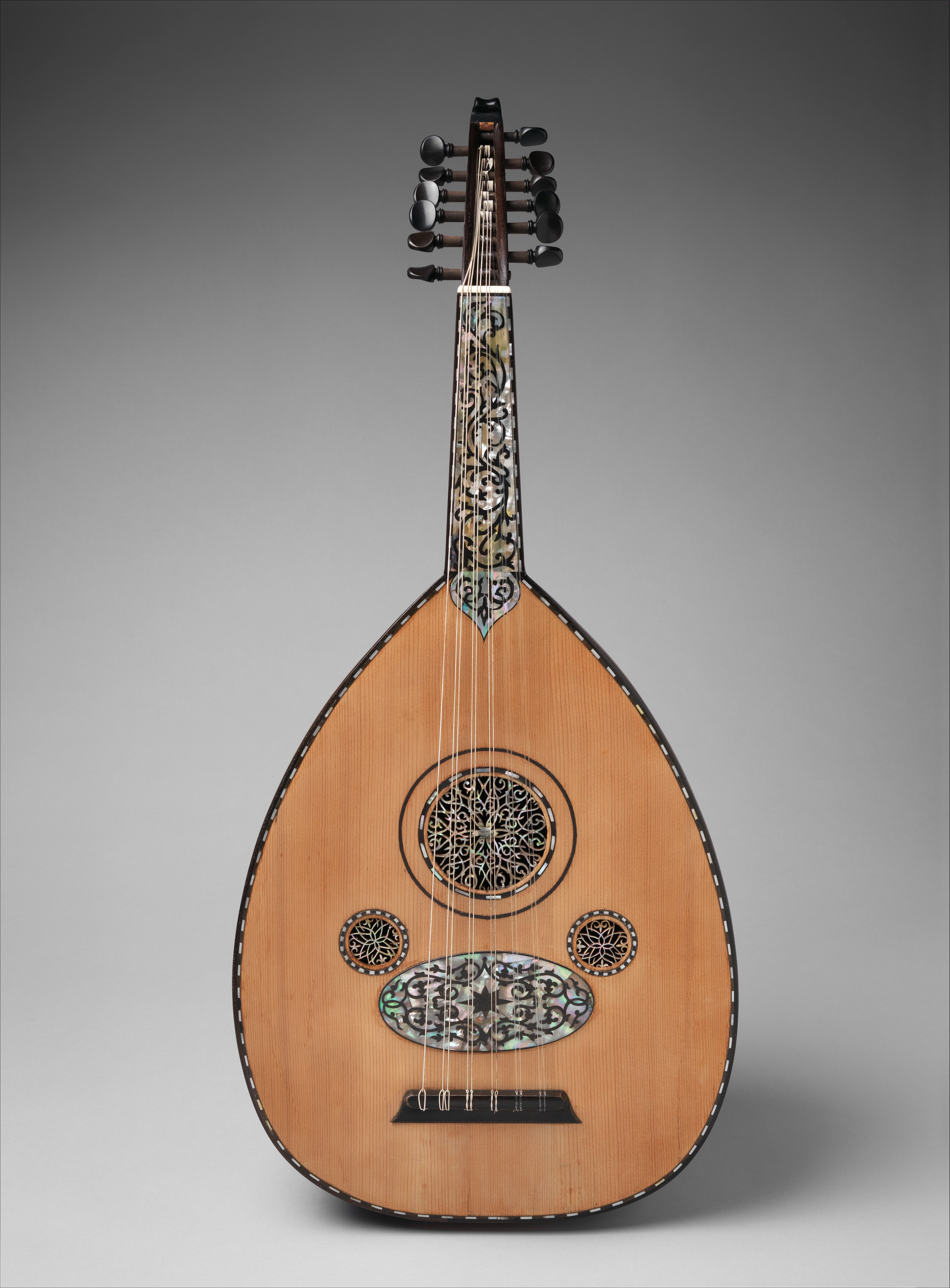
- An oud built by Emmanuel Venious (Manol) in 1915/16.
- Born: Emmanuel Venious; 1845; Ortaköy, Istanbul, Turkey
- Died: 1915 or 1916
- Occupations: Luthier, Carpenter
- Years active: 1870-1916

Emmanuel Venious, often better known simply by his professional name of Manol was a Greek Ottoman luthier living and working in Beyoğlu, Istanbul (then also known as Constantinople/Kostantiniyye).

He began by working as a furniture maker, before becoming a luthier. Today he is best known for developing the smaller, higher tuned version of the Oud now commonly known as the Turkish oud, commonly played in Turkey, Greece, Armenia, Azerbaijan and elsewhere, compared to the more varied, lower pitched and often larger Arabic oud. He also built the lavta.
