= Mathias Heinicke =

Bohemian violin maker

Matthias Heinicke (3 March 1873 – 1956) was a Bohemian violin maker and pupil of Ernst Reinhold Schmidt (1857–1928) in Marktneukirchen, Vogtlandkreis, Saxony in what is today Germany

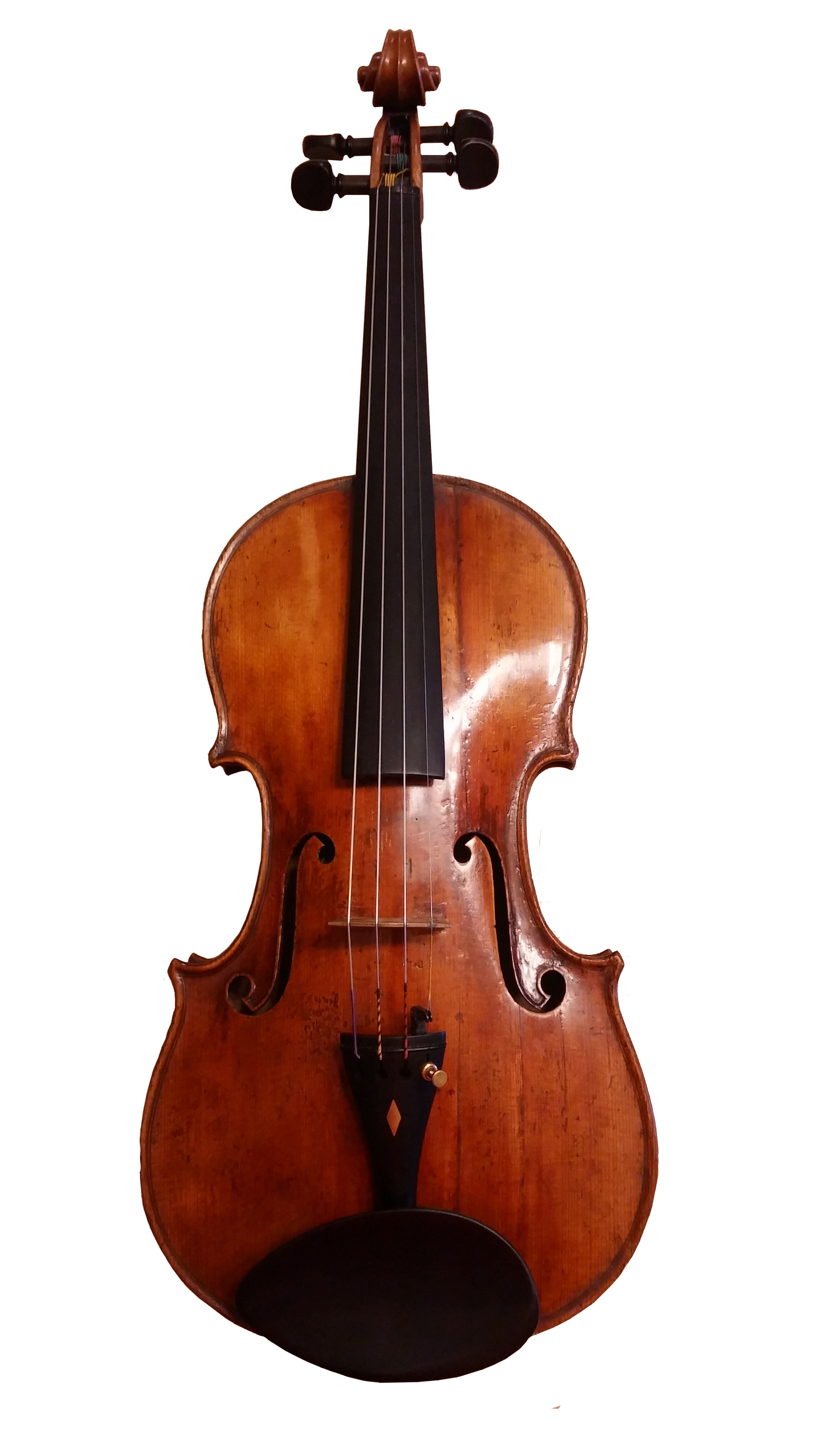
Violin by Matthias Heinicke from 1920

== Life and work ==
The exact date of Heinicke's birth could have been 1871 or 23 March 1873, but Karel Jalovec argued that Heinicke celebrated his 81st birthday on 3 March 1954. Heinicke was a native of Maria Kulm, Bohemia. His wandering years led him via Berlin and Budapest to Venice to Eugenio Degani (1875).

However, the effective time at Degani is not documented. Since the construction of his violins clearly show Italian influences but does not allow direct references, some dealers tend to interpret this section of his curriculum vitae as an advertising measure. Heinicke himself used clear indications of this on his opulently designed letterheads and envelopes.

Heinicke developed into one of the main representatives of violin makers in Bohemia in the first half of the 20th century. After his return in 1897, he set up his own workshop in Wildstein near Eger. Formal and decisive for his instruments were the old masters Stradivari and Amati, after whose models he made his own violins. Heinicke did an excellent job and his violins achieved, well preserved, prices between €3,000 and €6,000.

Heinicke died in Skalná, in what is today the Czech Republic.

== Violin making ==
Heinicke often used materials that he could use from old woods from church buildings. This meant that he had access to stored wood, as the tonewoods of the southern Italian Alpine region were not available to him. Although the maple he used was beautiful to look at, it was more noticeable for its beautiful, dense flaming than for its excellent acoustic properties.

Heinicke used a double stripe with light stripes in the middle as an ornamental inlay for his violins. These works have not always been carried out with the same care that is known from his violins. In order to improve the colour appearance of his violin wood, he added pink pigments to his yellow shellac. The curvature of the instruments was made by Heinicke according to tonal aspects rather than favours for the eye.

However, this promoted the full tone of his instruments. He cut the F-holes almost steeply and precisely. Heinicke's instruments are characterized by a full, warm tone, with a strong presence in the lower range. Characteristic are its narrow screw designs, which he carved in deep engraving.

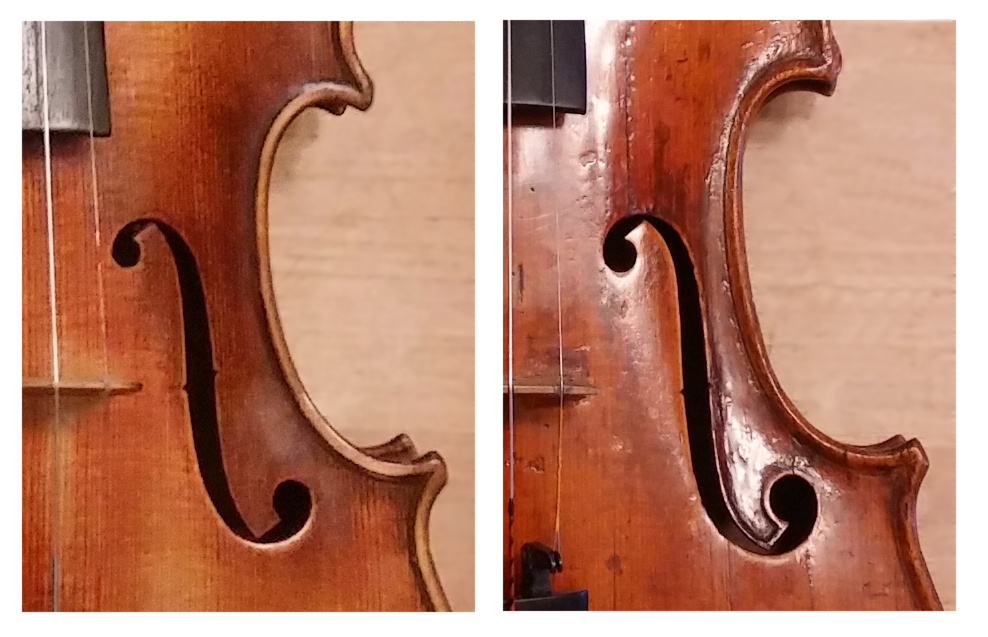
Detailed comparison of the F-holes of a Saxon manufacture violin around 1920 (left) with those of a violin by Mathias Heinicke from 1921 (right)

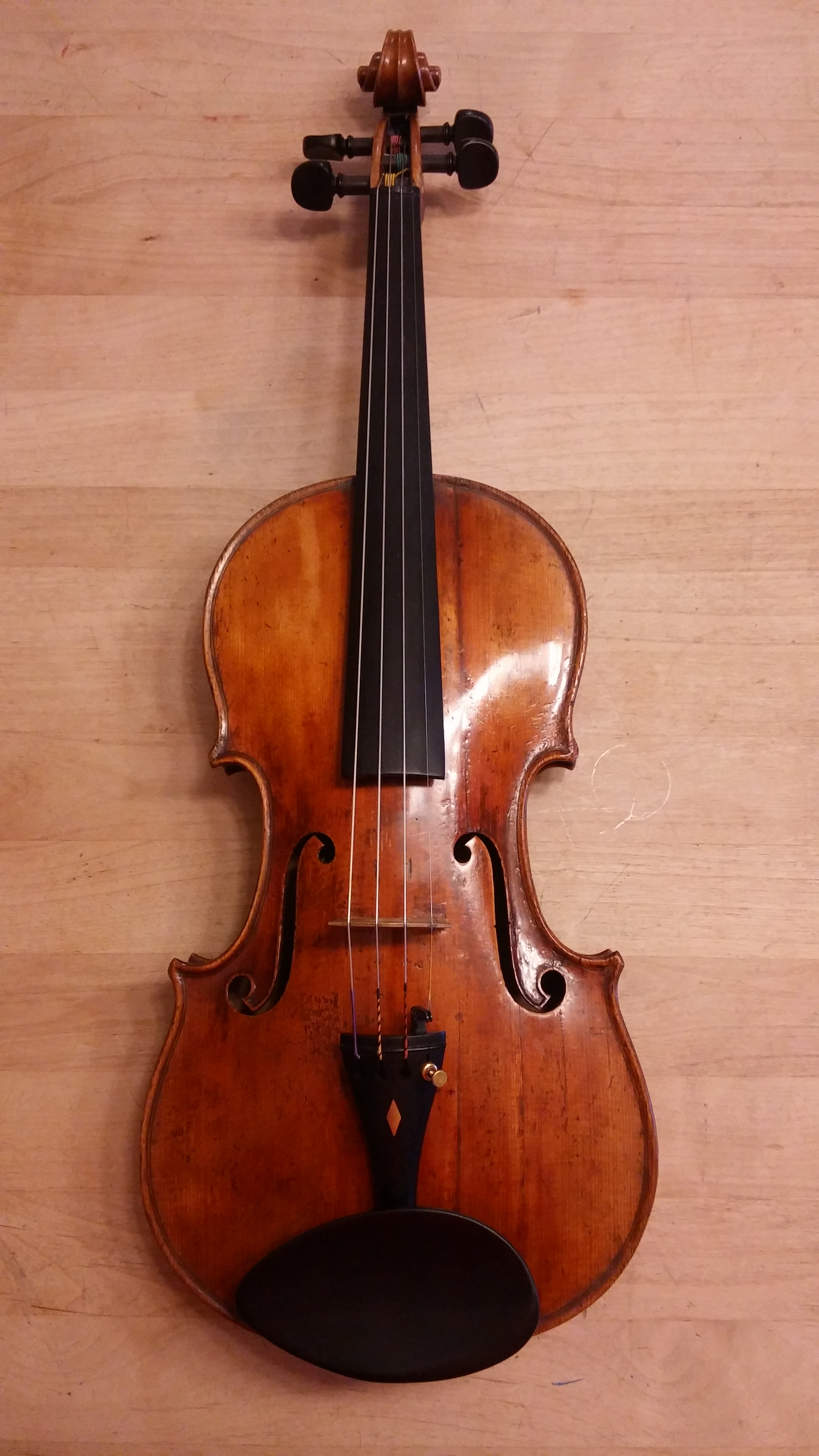
Violin of Matthias Heinicke von 1920

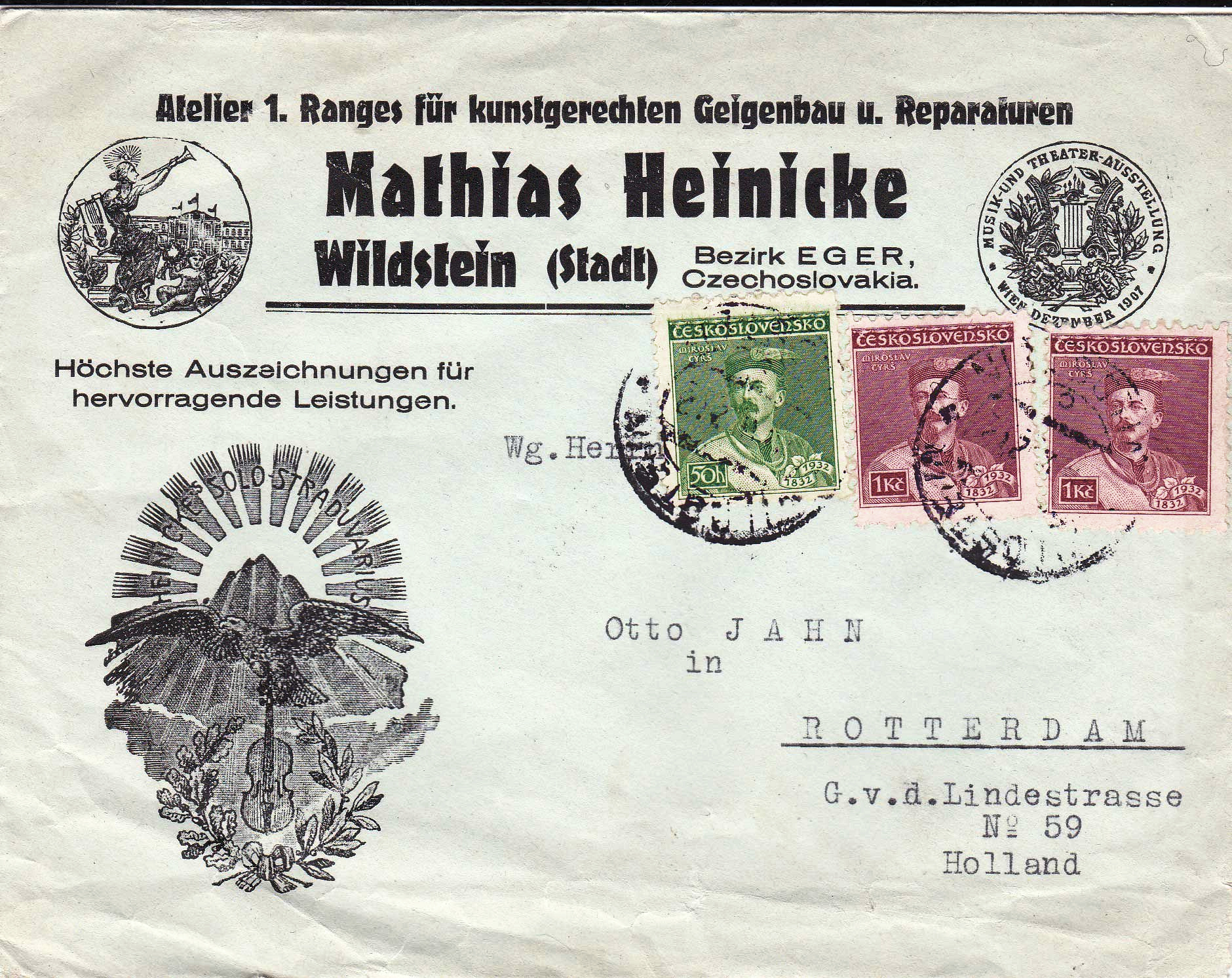
Envelope by Mathias Heinicke for his correspondence around 1931

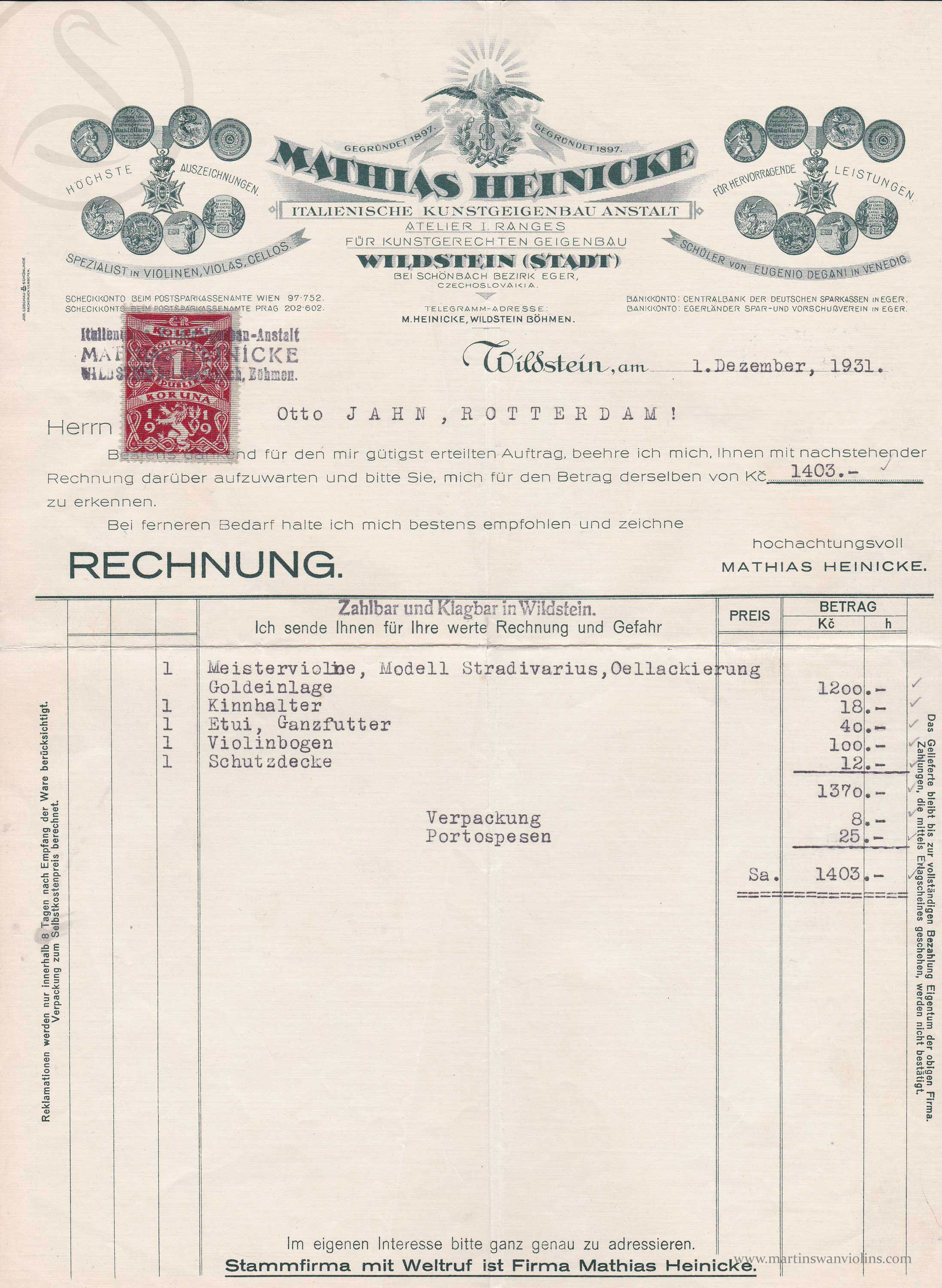
Invoice for the sale of a Heinicke violin from 1931

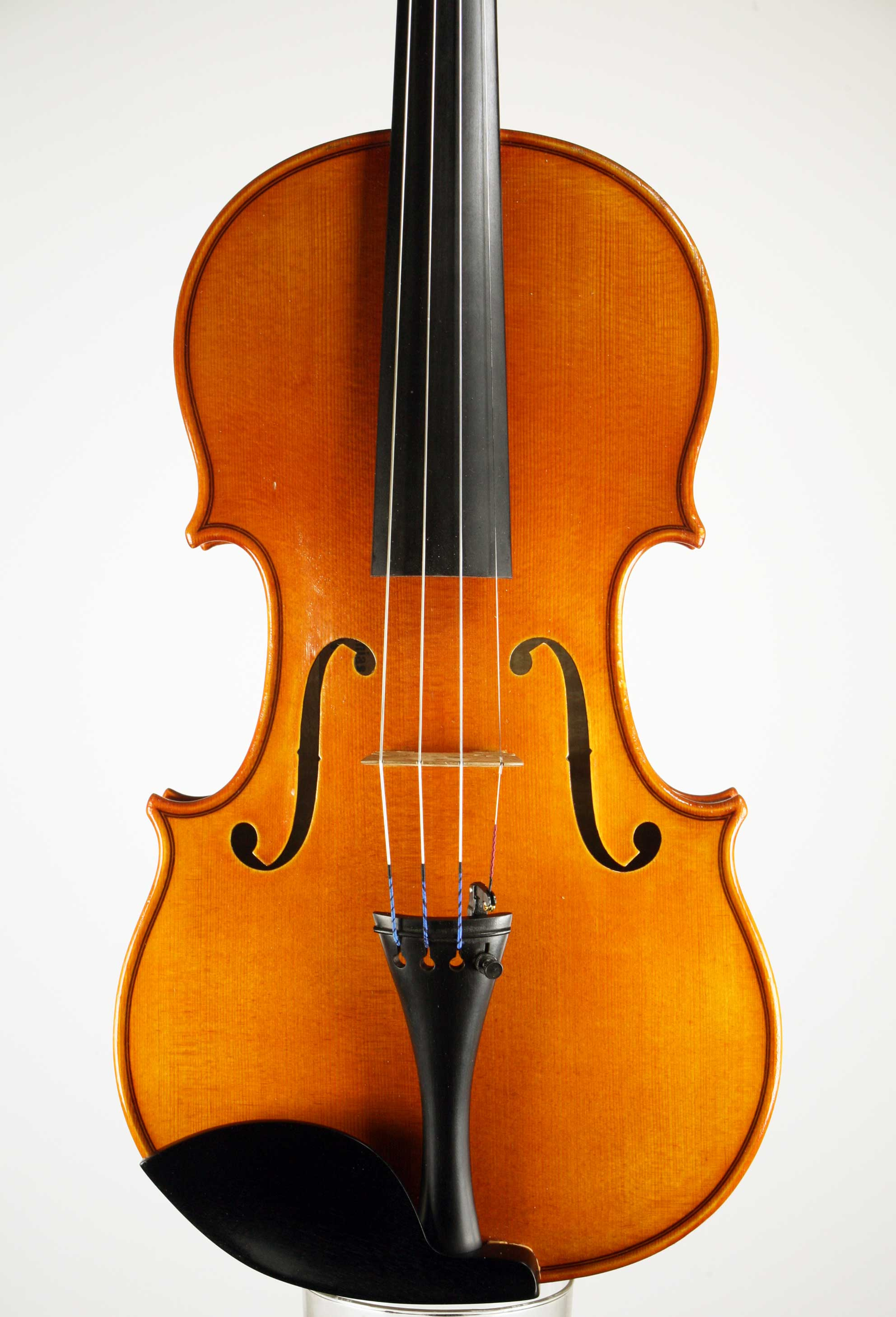
Top side of a Heinicken Vioilin from 1931

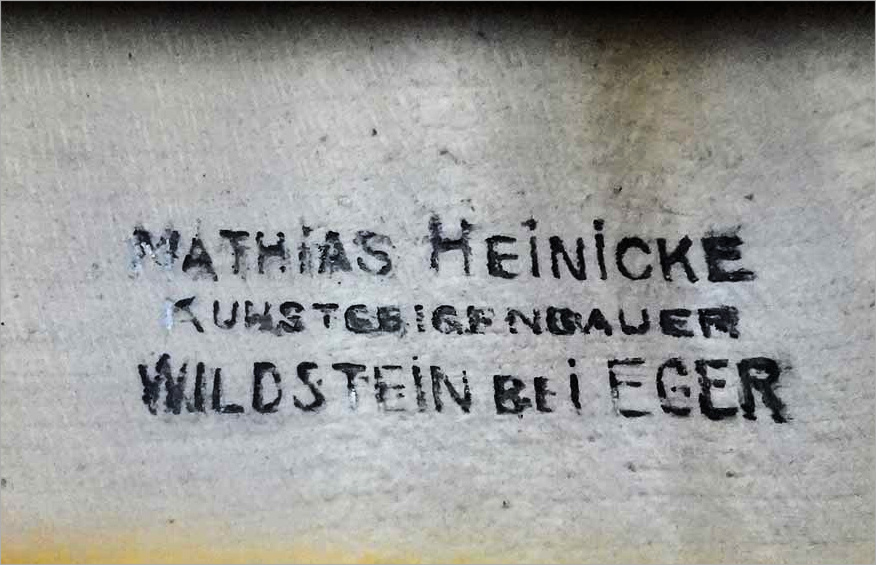
Brand Stamp of Mathias Heinicke as of 1931

== Instruments ==
Some of the violins by Heinicke are still in remarkably good condition on the market today. Nevertheless, their origin can seldom be proven without gaps in order to calculate a value date at the time of creation. However, violin dealer Martin Swan has received the bills and the accompanying letter for a Heinicke violin, which means that the value of the instrument can still be calculated today.

The violin from 1931 shown here was sold for 1403 Czech crowns. The exchange rate of the Crown against the Reichsmark was 0.85 in 1932. This results in a price of around 1200 Reichsmark. This corresponded to the cost of living for half a year for a family of three in 1935. Converted to the cost of living 2016, this would result in a price of €20,000 according to today's standard.

Heinicke's violins were thus in the upper segment for orchestral musicians, both in 1935 and, adjusted for value adjustments, in 2016.
