= Simon Straub =

German violinmaker and luthier

Simon Straub (1662 - 1730) was a German violin maker and luthier. He was born in Friedenweiler and spent most of his life in Langenordnach.

Simon Straub is considered one of the most significant violin makers of the Alemannische Schule (Alemannic school) in Black Forest. He was a member of the Straub-Dynasty, a family of luthiers for 9 generations. One of his violins was used by Ludwig van Beethoven and is part of the Beethoven House exhibition.
