= Jenny Bailly =

20th century French luthier

- Born: 1874; Mirecourt, Vosges, France
- Died: 1970 (aged 95–96); Meru, Oise, France
- Occupation: Luthier.
- Known for: Accomplished 20th century French luthier. She is one of the few recorded female violin makers of that time period.

Jenny Bailly (1874 – 1970) was an accomplished 20th-century French luthier. She is one of the few recorded female violin makers of that time period.

Jenny was the daughter of renowned luthier Paul Joseph Bailly (1844–1907), who studied under experts such as Jules Gaillard and Nicolas Vuillaume. Paul was well-travelled and worked in the United States, England, as well as several different locations in France, before finally settling up his workshop in Paris.

Jenny worked closely with her father throughout his life. She took over the Paris workshop in 1907, after his death, and she managed it up until 1935.
