= Gerundino Fernández =

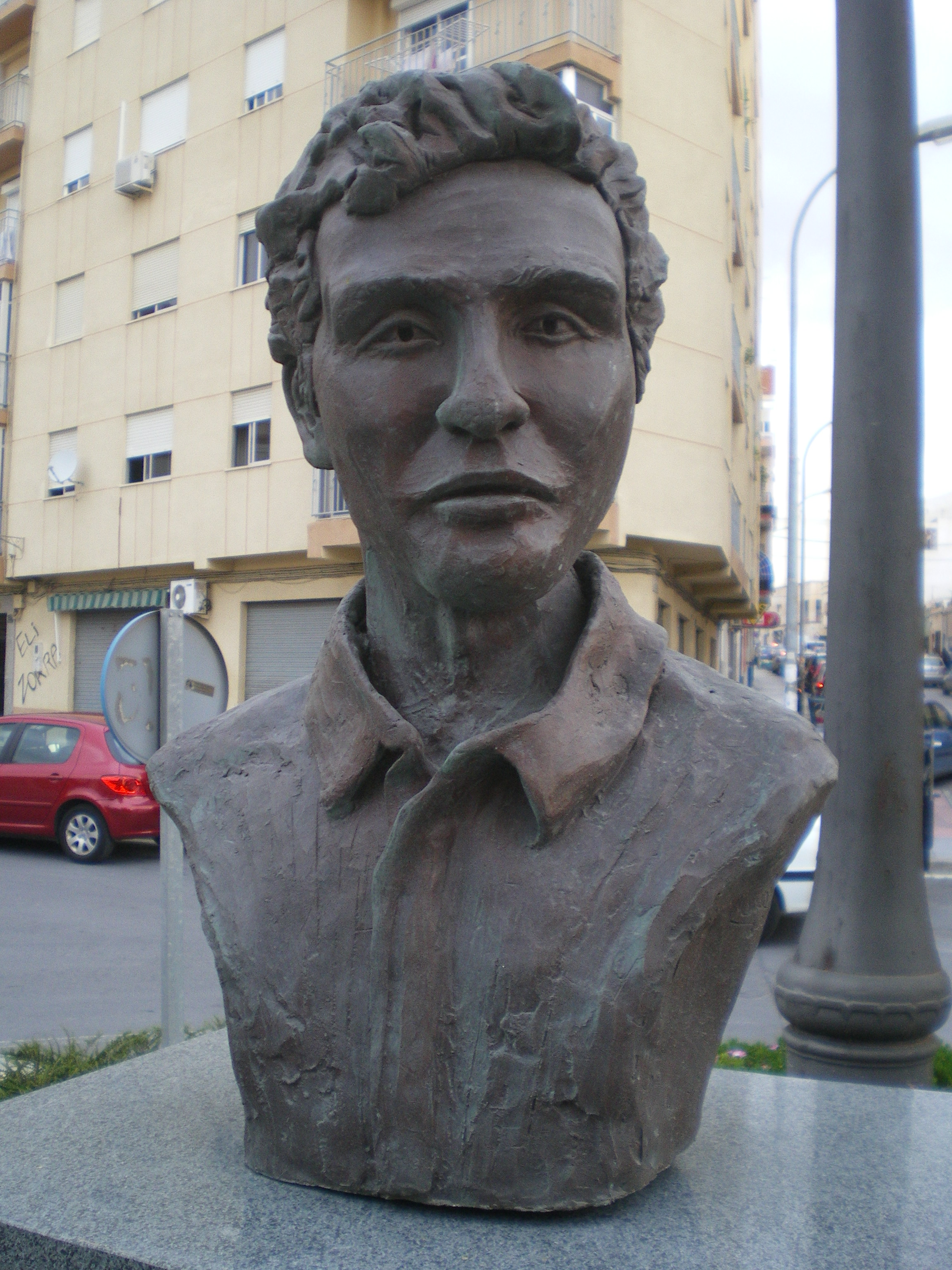
Gerundino Fernández García

Gerundino Miguel Fernández García (1931–2006) was a Spanish luthier, considered one of the world's greatest makers of flamenco guitars.

== Biography ==
Gerundino was born in Almería, south-eastern Spain. At the age of 19, he began to learn to play the guitar from a friend to make a little money playing serenades. In this he was perhaps influenced by the environment of Almeria and by his father and grandfather who were musically inclined. His brother Eladio Fernandez used to play flamenco professionally and moved to Paris. His first guitar was made by copying a friend's guitar, having some manual skills from having been a cabinet maker or "carpintero". The guitar was extremely good and so, in 1958, he began to build guitars full-time, opening his own workshop in Almería in 1960. Experiments in guitar design, and years of pondering the matrix of elements that produce outstanding guitars, led him to develop what he considered to be a perfect design. Gerundino was a low-volume maker, producing perhaps 10-12 instruments each year. After his retirement in 1999, his workshop continued to put out a few instruments each year, although his personal input cannot be confirmed for these guitars.

== Guitars ==
Gerundino instruments are known for their raspy growl and volume, well balanced intonation and "gutsy" percussive sound. His instruments are typically made of lightweight Cypress wood for back and sides, with either German Spruce or Western Red Cedar for the top. Occasionally, he would make "flamenco negra" guitars as well, with backs and sides of Indian Rosewood or Brazilian rosewood. These instruments begin to take on more of the tonal qualities of a Spanish classical guitar, although Gerundino's bracing system and construction maintain the essence of the flamenco sound. Players of his instruments include Paco Peña, Paco de Lucia, Juan Martin, Tomatito and Eric Clapton. 1988 Gerundino won the 1st prize of acoustic in the world competition of luthiers sponsored by UNESCO in Paris. Clapton's 1976 Gerundino sold for $16,730 at his 2004 Christie's auction, believed to be the highest price ever paid for a Gerundino.

Common to almost all flamenco guitars, Gerundinos have clear plastic "tap plates" or golpeadores, close to the sound hole, where the guitarist can strike his/her nails and knuckles to create the percussive effects which are essential to and idiosyncratic of flamenco guitar playing. In flamenco playing, the guitar acts as much as a rhythm instrument as a solo instrument.
