= Paolo de Barbieri =

Paolo De Barbieri (1889 in Genoa – 1964) was an Italian violin maker. Trained in Cesare Candi's workshop, Paolo DeBarbieri is now considered one of the best violin makers of the school of Genova. His style changes greatly during the years, but it is always easy recognisable for his unmistakable making technique, based on the 'continuous' linings (the linings are not mitred or set in the central blocks, but pass over - two pieces only per plate instead of six). His workmanship is fine and inspired, and reveal very good taste and good technique.

== Biography ==
At the age of 13, he left a note on his kitchen table stating "be back in a minute".....leaving for six years to work as a sailorboy. Upon his return, he frequently visited the workshop of Cesare Candi, becoming his first true pupil (soon after which he married a cousin of Candi's wife, becoming a part of the family). During his military service (in the Navy) in 1912, he participated in the famous Dardanelli Battle for which he received a medal. During this time, he also made guitars for the soldiers.

The real beginning of his own career was in 1918-1919 (after the Great War), in a workshop located at Piazza Paolo da Novi 5/14. He won a great many awards and prizes including a Gold Medal 1929 in Barcelona, Silver Medal 1931 Padua. At the 1949 Cremona competition / Stradivari exhibit, he exhibited two violins, one viola and a quartet. For the quartet he was awarded a silver medal and a special prize (Gold Medal) assigned by the executive committee for the "best quartet made by a living Italian Violin Maker". He also won two gold medals in Rome at the competition held by the Royal Academy in 1954 and 1955 and 1956, where he won two silver medals and a prize in the bow category (he was also a gifted bow maker).

Candi left a permanent imprint on both professional and amateur 20th-century Genoese violin making. Paolo de Barbieri entered Candi's workshop when he was about 30, having previously been a sailor and soldier. He learnt external mould construction from Candi, as well as the use of continuous linings, which he employed throughout his life. He made more than 360 violins, as well as violas, cellos and guitars. In his early period he used his master's Strad model, followed later by a personal Strad model with narrow f-holes and round archings; but his main model was the ‘Cannon’ Guarneri ‘del Gesù’, which since Praga had been a steady reference for all Genoese makers.

De Barbieri's place in Candi's workshop was taken in 1924 by a talented young woodworker called Giuseppe Bernardo Lecchi (1895–1967), originally from a southern Piedmontese village. "Lecchi proved the ideal partner for Candi and made a considerable contribution to his last series of decorated instruments, taking charge of the delicate inlays."

It is necessary to point out the importance of the world-renowned 'del Gesù' of Paganini "Il Cannone" for every violin maker of Genoa. De Barbieri's interpretation/copy stands out amongst them.

Paolo de Barbieri's son Renato de Barbieri (1929–1991) was a well-known concert violinist/soloist.

== More info ==
- La Liuteria Italiana / Italian Violin Making in the 1800s and 1900s - Umberto Azzolina
- I Maestri Del Novecento - Carlo Vettori
- La Liuteria Lombarda del '900 - Roberto Codazzi, Cinzia Manfredini 2002
- Dictionary of 20th Century Italian Violin Makers - Marlin Brinser 1978
- Vannes, Rene (1985) [1951]. Dictionnaire Universel del Luthiers (vol.3). Bruxelles: Les Amis de la musique. OCLC 53749830.
- William, Henley (1969). Universal Dictionary of Violin & Bow Makers. Brighton; England: Amati. ISBN 0-901424-00-5.
