= Silvio de Lellis =

Italian luthier (1923–1998)

Silvio de Lellis (1923 in Rome – 1998 in Rome), recorded as Sylvio de Lellis in Canadian sources, was an Italian luthier.

He was the second son of Baron de Lellis, a descendant of the family which gave birth to St Camillus de Lellis, in the 16th century. Silvio de Lellis apprenticed as a violin maker and was destined to take over a piano factory belonging to the family in Czechoslovakia, which the Communist take-over prevented. He had to practice his craft for a living afterwards. In 1949 he took first prize at the Concorso Internazionale di Liuteria in Cremona.

He was invited in Canada to set up a guitar manufacture in the 1970s, but it seems the project was poorly conceived and he remained stranded in Montreal, Quebec, with almost no money left. He was associated with Frank Ravenda as a violin maker, Ravenda being a music instruments salesman. In 1975, de Lellis moved to Quebec City, where a good luthier was needed, and after getting a teaching job at the conservatory through the efforts of his apprentice, he finally opened a school of lutherie in that city. De Lellis left Quebec City for Rome in 1979, where he resumed his practice as a luthier. He had his last workshop in Tivoli, some 50 km from Rome, and became widely recognised as a teacher. De Lellis died in 1998 of a heart attack.
