= Jacob Rayman =

Luthier (fl. 1620–1650)

Jacob Rayman (fl. 1620–1650) was a violin-maker, thought to be the first in England.

== Life ==
It is thought that Jacob Rayman was born in Faulenbach in Füssen (a town in present-day Bavaria known today for its violin-making), and came to London in 1620. The earliest violin label bearing his name was dated 1630, the address Bell Yard, Southwark; the earliest surviving instrument is dated 1641, and has the address Blackman Street, Long Southwark. He apparently remained in Southwark until at least 1658. Unlike other stringed instrument makers in London at the time, he did not make viols.

Nothing is known of him after 1658. His son Jacob, baptized in 1642, is thought to have been working as a violin-maker in 1691.

Jacob had a number of children, at least one of whom also became an instrument maker. Christening records from 1620 show a child Elizabeth, born to Jacob Rayman. However, there also exists a marriage record of a Jacob Rayman to a Miss Taylor in 1625. All records are in the Southwark area of London. A daughter Sophia was baptised in 1626. His daughter Mary was baptised in 1644 in St. Saviour's Church, Southwark. The entry reads: Mary, daughter of Jacob Rayman, Instrument Maker. Jacob's son, Charles Rayman, was baptised at St. Saviour's Church, Southwark in 1650. The entry reads: Charles, son of Jacob Rayman, Instrument Maker. A son Isaak was christened in 1653. In June 1654 his son Jacob, recorded in the parish register as an instrument maker, married Joane Aves at St. Saviour's Church, Southwark.

There is a record of a burial of a Jacob Rayman at St Margaret's Church, Westminster, England on 13 September 1659.

== His violins ==
An important source of information about Rayman's work is the catalogue of the sale of the collection of Thomas Britton, who died in 1714; four lots each described as "an extraordinary Rayman" were in the sale, as well as instruments of leading London makers of the day. His instruments appeared in saleroom catalogues in the 19th century, but more recently few have been identified. In general, Rayman's violins are elongated, having centre bouts straighter than usual, and longer f-holes.

The Strad, iii. 77, commented: "His instruments, albeit rough, have plenty of character, well-cut scrolls, and superb varnish".
