= Giovan Giacomo Dalla Corna =

Italian violin maker

Giovan Giacomo Dalla Corna (Brescia ca. 1485 – ca. 1560) was an Italian violin maker. He was one of the first in what is now known as the "Brescian school". He appears in Brescian tax documents for 1524, 1534 and 1548 as a merchant, in addition to being a violin and lute maker. He is mentioned in the music treatise Scintille di Musica, edited in Brescia in 1533 by Giovan Maria Lanfranco, who says "Luths, Violones, Lyras and similar, very clear and resonant are constructed by the two Brescians Giovan Giacobo dalla Corna and Zanetto Micheli". Some scholars believe that he was the son of Joan Maria da Bressa, who was an active instrument maker in the early decades of 1500 in Venice.

== Sources ==
- Giovanni Maria Lanfranco, Scintille di Musica, Brescia, 1530
- Dassenno, Flavio - Ravasio, Ugo "Gasparo da Salò e la liuteria bresciana tra rinascimento e barocco". Brescia 1990.
- Dassenno, Flavio, "Per gli occhi e 'l core. Strumenti musicali nell'arte". Cortefranca, 2004.
- AA. VV. "Gasparo architetto del suono": a cura di Dassenno Flavio, Città di Salò, 2009.
