= José Yacopi =

José Yacopi (28 December 1916, in Victoria, Spain – 11 August 2006, in San Fernando, Argentina) was a Spanish, and later Argentinian luthier.

Yacopi learned the art of guitar making from his father, Gamaliel Jacopi. In 1944, at the age of 27, he won first place at the Concurso Provincial de Artesanía ("Provincial Crafts Competition") in Barcelona and at the Concurso Nacional de Oficios Artesanos ("Official National Crafts Competition") in Madrid for a Neapolitan-style mandolin.

In 1947, Yacopi and his father created, and later patented, an original internal strutting system for reinforcing the top of the guitar. This gives his guitars distinctive and special sound characteristics. In 1949, Jose Yacopi and his wife, Pilar Perez-Menchaca, moved to General Villegas, then moving to San Fernando, Argentina in 1951, where Yacopi remained for the rest of his life. In 1961, together with his brother in law Agustin Perez-Menchaca, he established a guitar factory in San Fernando. Although he constructed various string instruments, he specialized in Spanish guitars.

Among the recognized artists who have bought Yocopi's guitars are María Luisa Anido, Julian Bream, Atahualpa Yupanqui, Luis Miguel, Eric Clapton, Irma Costanzo, Eduardo Falú, Edmundo Rivero, and Narciso Yepes.
