= John Cruz (luthier) =

American guitar builder

- Occupation: Luthier
- Years active: 1987–present
- Website: johncruzcustomguitars.com

Signature
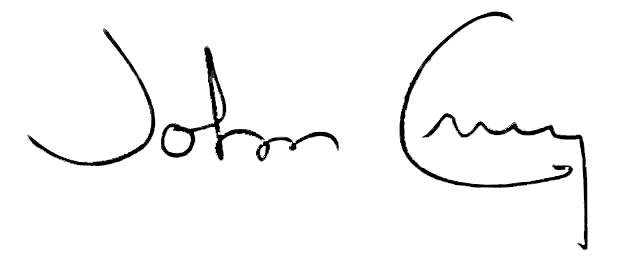

John Cruz is an American luthier who worked for Fender from 1987 to 2020. After his career at Fender, he launched his own guitar brand, John Cruz Custom Guitars.

== Career ==
Cruz is a former master builder who worked in the Fender Custom Shop. Cruz began working for the Fender company in 1987 and became a master builder in 2003. Two projects that Cruz oversaw were the creation of the Stevie Ray Vaughan replica Stratocaster and the recreation of the 1961 Fiesta Red Stratocaster played by blues guitarist Gary Moore.

In 2020, Cruz was fired after he made a Facebook post regarding Black Lives Matter protesters. The post was a meme of a bloody jeep with the words: "I don't know what you mean by protestors on the freeway, I came through no problem."

After leaving Fender in 2020 he started his own guitar company called John Cruz Custom Guitars that same year. He is regularly referred to as a "legendary musical instrument builder". The first 50 guitars he produced were called the ‘Premier Fifty’, and they sold to guitar dealers in less than 24 hours. The new company had to stop taking orders after the demand exceeded production.

Cruz also collaborates with Dean Guitars. In 2021, Cruz was tasked to give the Leslie West signature model a distressed finish.

Cruz closed John Cruz Custom Guitars in 2023.

In 2024 John Cruz launched a Limited Edition of guitars in collaboration with Paoletti Guitars.

In 2026, John Cruz announced a limited run of stratocaster-inspired guitars with budget Chinese brand Farida Guitars.

== See also ==
- List of luthiers
