= Andrea Tacchi =

Italian luthier (born 1956)

Andrea Tacchi (born 28 July 1956) is an Italian luthier who specializes in classical guitar making.

== Biography ==
Born and raised in Florence, Italy, Tacchi took an interest in creating musical instruments from an early age, building his first guitar at age 15. In 1977, he began studying guitar making with Argentinian luthier Ricardo Brané. After Brané’s death, Tacchi traveled to Spain, England, France, and the United States to study with various masters, going in 1981 to Spain to meet with many Spanish luthiers including Paulino Bernabe Senior, José Ramírez, Francisco and Gabriel Fleta to get their critical opinions and advice on his guitar making. With the same goal in mind, he went twice to England to consult with José Romanillos.

Most importantly, during the early 1980s, Tacchi went several times to Paris to visit with Robert Bouchet and Daniel Friederich in their workshops, always with the objective in mind of growing as a luthier through their advice. In Castres, France in 1985, Tacchi competed in the "Concours International des Facteurs de Guitare" organized by Robert Vidal of Radio France. There, he won first prize for Aesthetic Qualities and second general prize for Acoustic Qualities.

Experienced in the restoration of guitars and other antique string instruments, Tacchi has carried out such restorations as the Pagés guitar of Jacob Lindberg, string basses for musicians of the Teatro Comunale di Firenze, and a classical guitar built by Hermann Hauser.

Tacchi has built over 350 guitars, some owned by guitarists including Filomena Moretti, Flavio Cucchi, Carlo Marchione, Antigoni Goni, Robert Gruca, Colin Davin, Minoru Inagaki, and Marcelo Kayath, while others belong to important private collections. Two of his guitars are in the collection of the Conservatorio Luigi Cherubini in Florence, Italy.

== Coclea & Coclea Thucea ==
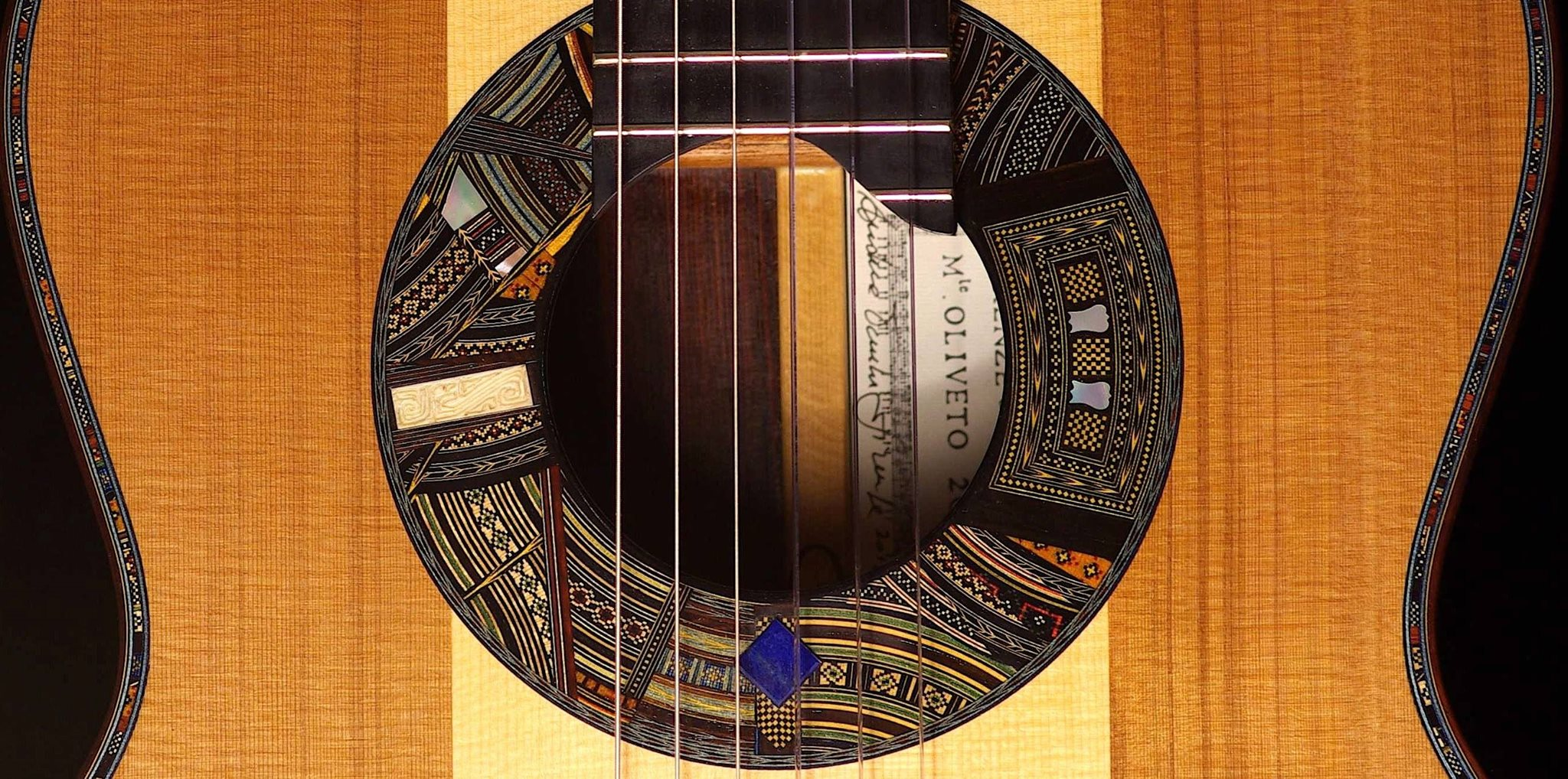
Detail of the Cerulea Coclea Thucea made by Tacchi in 2012

Tacchi is well known for a guitar he began building in 1989, the Coclea, which possesses unusually resonant acoustic properties. The name refers to the "cochlea" of the inner ear (coclea in Latin), the physiological place where noise is perceived as sound. The Coclea is designed on precise geometrical principles, of which its main characteristic is having top and back conceived of as portions of spheres of different radii. Tacchi explains his inspiration for the Coclea: "From the early 80s on, I became interested in understanding the rules adopted by luthiers of the 19th century for designing the form of their instruments, a series of circles and triangles in a mathematical relation to the length of the body. Then I developed a system of spheres of differing diameters and planes in such a way so that these tangents would compose the Coclea."

While he originally created two versions of the Coclea, one with a spruce top and another with a cedar top, it was in 1997 that Tacchi began to develop the idea for the Coclea Thucea, so named because of the combination of the two woods of which the sound board is composed: thuja plicata (western redcedar) and picea excelsa (spruce). Tacchi's Thucea design was partially inspired by a concept applied by Antonio Torres who created guitar soundboards with three strips of spruce of differing densities. He produced the first Coclea Thucea in 2000.

In 2012, Tacchi created a special model of the Coclea Thucea named "Cerulea." Destined for China, the predominant color of the decoration is cerulean blue, inspired by the image of the celestial empire. In the rosette there is a square tile of blue lapis lazuli and as 2012 was the year of the Dragon there is another tile representing a dragon carved from an antique piece of bone.

== Bouchet Homage ==
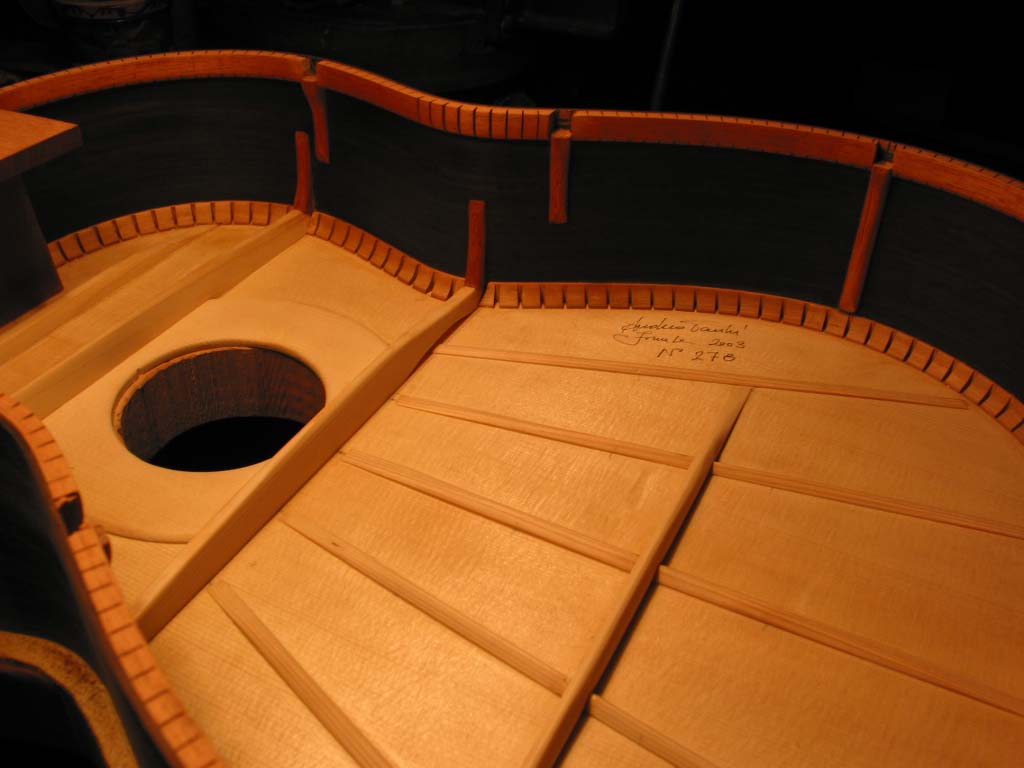
Andrea Tacchi Bouchet Homage interior photo by Andrea Tacchi

In honor of his former teacher, in 1994 Andrea Tacchi created his first reproduction of a Bouchet guitar, the Bouchet Homage. Following the Cahier d’atelier (workshop notebook) of Bouchet, later published by the Conservatoire de Paris, Tacchi created what is generally recognized as a personalized replica of the master’s instrument.

In 1998 the Florentine luthier was invited to exhibit this guitar in Shibuya, Tokyo at the celebration of the 100-year anniversary of Bouchet’s birth. Concerning Bouchet, Tacchi has written: "He linked the 'gesture' with the material, a characteristic typical of sculptors, and one ought not to forget that Bouchet started out as both a painter and a sculptor."

== García & Simplicio Replicas ==
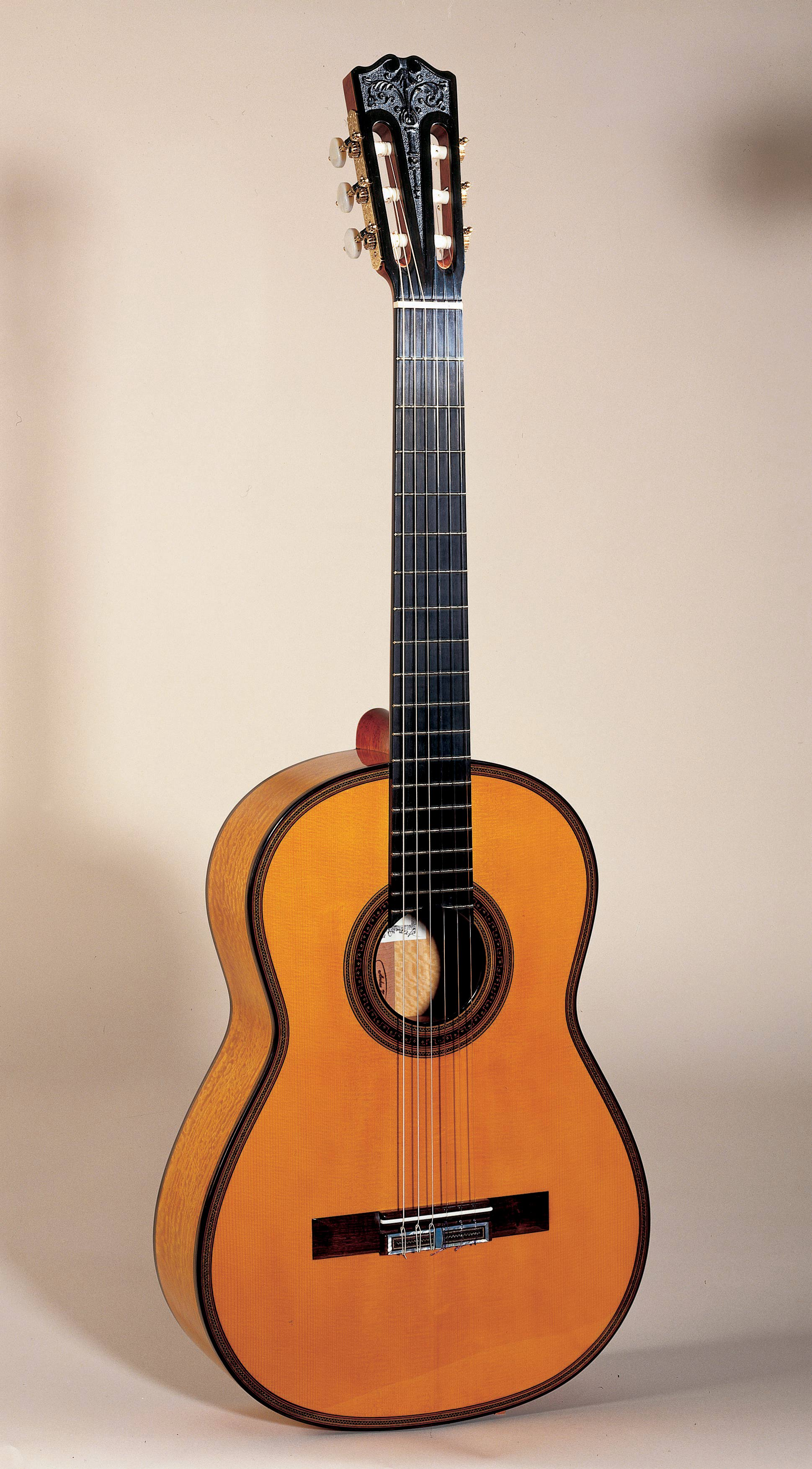
Andrea Tacchi Simplicio Replica, photo by Andrea Faggi property Andrea Tacchi

In 1999 after intense study of Catalan lutherie, Tacchi began to make replicas of García and Simplicio Guitars. Concerning the task of creating replicas of guitars by these two masters Tacchi has written: "When I set out to create a homage to maestro García, my state of mind is quite different from the great white canvas ready to be filled with colors that Simplicio represents for me. I feel freer, more tranquil, and more self-confident. Simplicio is more severe. During the period in which I was assiduously studying his work I dreamed of him often and I always felt intimidated and embarrassed before him."

== Skrjabin Homage ==
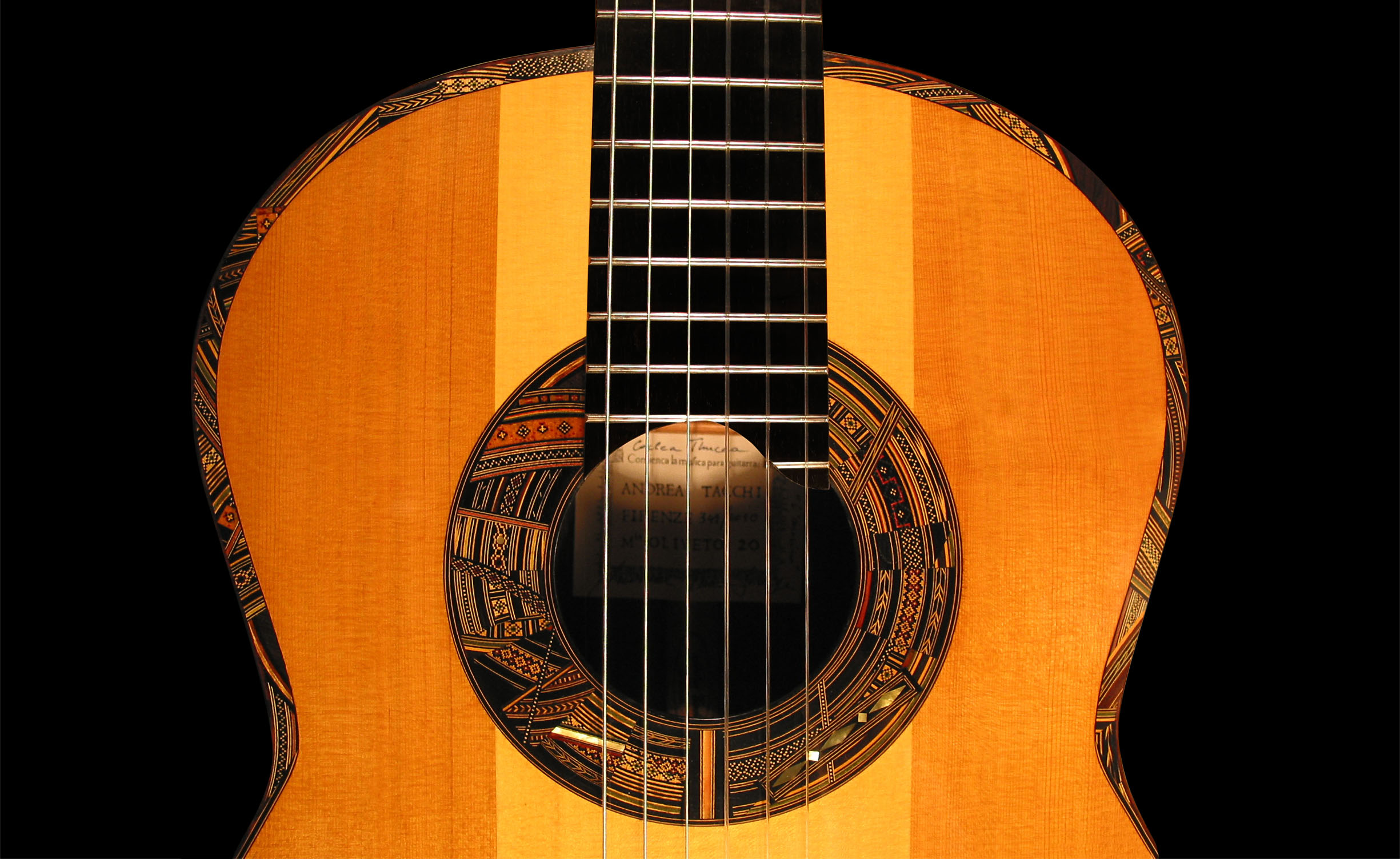
Andrea Tacchi Skrjabin Homage, photo made by Andrea Tacchi

Inspired by the piano works of the Russian composer Alexander Scriabin, Tacchi created a unique Coclea Thucea named the Skrjabin Homage in 2010. This guitar was unveiled on 23 May 2010 at the Cleveland Institute of Music, played by Jason Vieaux for an encore.

== Articles and lectures by Andrea Tacchi ==
"Una strada da seguire" in Francisco Simplicio luthier: Note di viaggio sulle tracce di Francisco e Miguel Simplicio nella Barcellona fra Modernismo e Seconda Republica Diego Milanese and Umberto Piazza, eds. Il Dialogo, Milan 2010 pp. 180–190

"Inside the Tacchi Workshop" at the Classical Guitar Weekend, Cleveland, Ohio 22 May 2010

"Rue de la Guitare" in Guitar Salon Blog, 26 August 2013

Andrea Tacchi Interviews Daniel Friederich in Guitar Salon Blog, 25 August 2013 (reprinted from Il Fronimo vol. 101, 1998)

"Tacchi Workshop Firenze" at Corde Factum Guitar Festival, Puurs, Belgium 16 May 2010

"Robert Bouchet in Paris" Lecture for Media Calm Co., Ochanomizu, Tokyo, May 2010

"Robert Bouchet chez les japonais" trans. Fabio Ragghianti Les Cahiers de la Guitar et de la Musique n.70, 1999, p. 11

Simplicio Biography for Rodgers Tuning Machines 1999

"Masaru Kohno: Intervista esclusiva" in Guitart V, n. XX, Oct-Dec 2000 pp. 4–7

"Meet the Maker: Masaru Kohno" in American Lutherie #62 Summer 2000

"Intervista a Daniel Friederich" in Il Fronimo rivista di chitarra n.101 Jan 1998 pp. 9–14

== Discography ==
Flavio Cucchi Presents Works by Castelnuovo Tedesco (ARC Music) 1996

Flavio Cucchi From Dowland to Chick Corea (GuitArt) 2002

Flavio Cucchi Guitar Favourites (Oxmedia) 2003

Flavio Cucchi I maestri della chitarra (Compilation Seicorde) 2003

Flavio Cucchi (DVD) GMC 2009

Colin Davin The Infinite Fabric of Dreams 2011

Robert Gruca "Handel Guitar Arrangements"

Filomena Moretti recordings on Tacchi guitar
