= Jim Fleeting =

Jim Fleeting is an English luthier. He is best known for building the UK's first nine-string bass guitar.

The Yorkshire Post has described him as "the UK's most talented and innovative young guitar-maker".

Fleeting studied at the Roberto-Venn School of Luthiery in Phoenix, Arizona, before establishing his workshop in Yorkshire, England.

His clients include the composer and guitarist Gordon Giltrap.
