= Loeiz Honoré =

Luthier

Loeiz Honoré (born 26 January 1961 at La Guerche de Bretagne, France) is a violin maker living in Cremona, Italy since 1978. Despite his being self-taught, in 1988 he won the "Homage to Stradivari" Violin Making Competition organized by the City of Cremona to celebrate the 250th anniversary of the death of Antonio Stradivari.

In 1999 Mr. Honoré placed in the finals in the cello section at the Paris Competition, and in 2000 at the Triennale di Cremona Competition. While specialized in building the cello, he also makes violins and violas, all exclusively following the classic Cremona tradition. His instruments are played in some of the most prestigious orchestras and chamber groups in Italy, France, Germany, U.S.A., South Korea and Japan. His instruments have been selected by artists of the caliber of Mstislav Rostropovich, Mario Brunello, and Enrico Dindo.

In addition to his work as a maker, Loeiz Honoré also has taught violin making at the International Violin Making School of Cremona, is an active member of the French Violin Makers' Association ALADFI, and was a founding member of the Consortium of Cremona Violin and Bow makers.
