= Dusepo =

English musician

- Born: Jo Dusepo; United Kingdom
- Genres: acoustic music, ambient electronic music, minimalism, classical music, dub, jazz, folk music, world music.
- Occupations: Musician, Luthier, Radio host, Sound engineer, Producer.
- Instruments: cobza, dombra, mandolin, charango, bandurria, requinto classical guitar, balalaika, Mexican vihuela, jarana jarocha, oud, lavta, cuatro
- Years active: 2006-present
- Website: dusepo.co.uk

Jo Dusepo, better known simply as Dusepo, is a luthier, multi-instrumentalist musician, ethnomusicologist, composer, radio host, sound engineer and producer from London, England. From November 2014 to 2017, she was a radio host on K2K Radio in Kilburn, west London.

== Luthier ==
Jo Dusepo has worked as a luthier since 2008, and specialises in world and historical stringed instruments, including mandolins, citterns and others.

== Musical styles ==
Many of her earlier music 2006–2010 was ambient, electronic music and dub in style, apart from the 2008 album Blue & Purple, which was minimalism. Since 2012, most of her music has been classical music, folk music, world music and acoustic music.

She has sung in English, German, Spanish, Romanian and Esperanto, and also worked as a sound engineer and producer for other artists.
