= Marchione Guitars =

Musical instrument manufacturing company of Houston, Texas

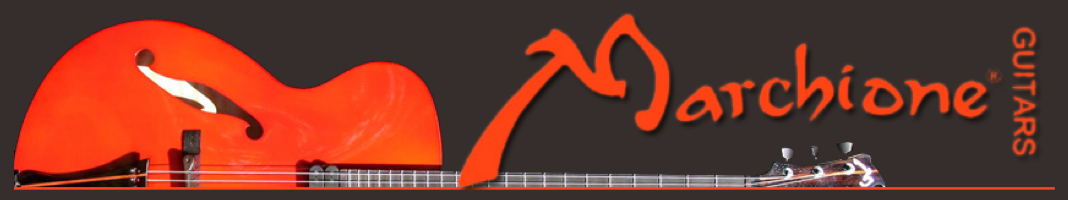
- Industry: Musical instruments
- Founded: 1993
- Founder: Stephen Raphael Marchione
- Headquarters: Houston, Texas
- Website: www.marchione.com

Marchione Guitars of Houston, Texas, is a manufacturer of stringed instruments, such as acoustic and electric guitars, fretless bass guitars, and violins. The company was founded in Manhattan by Stephen Raphael Marchione, and moved to Houston in 2001. Marchione has been a luthier since 1990.

== History ==
Marchione started building stringed instruments in 1990 after graduating from Naropa University where he received B.A. in music. Marchione found an apprenticeship with Pensa-Suhr Guitars, and worked with John Suhr and Mas Hino, acquiring a reputation as an "expert luthier". He opened Marchione Guitars in 1993 on 20th St. After the September 11 attacks in 2001, Marchione decided to move back with his family to his hometown of Houston.

Since 1999 Marchione has collaborated with Mark Whitfield, on five different archtop guitars. He also makes electric guitars, including the Transparent Blue Neck, Through the Body Electric.

== Notable players ==
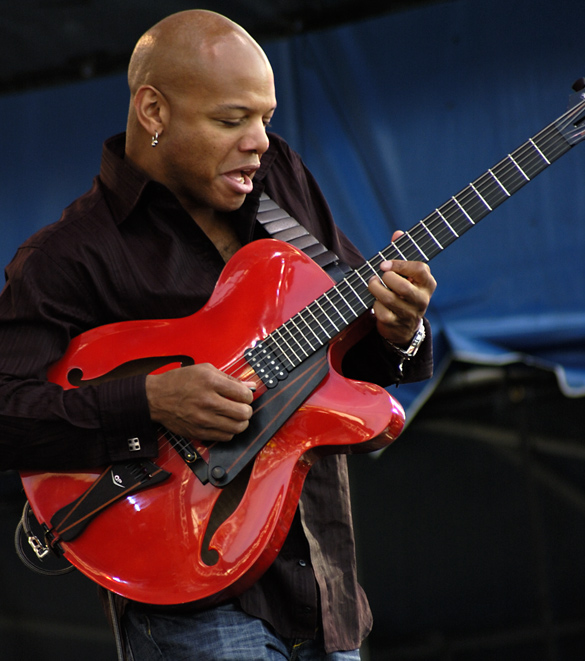
Mark Whitfield with a Marchione 16" archtop

- Mark Whitfield
