= Skalná =

- Town
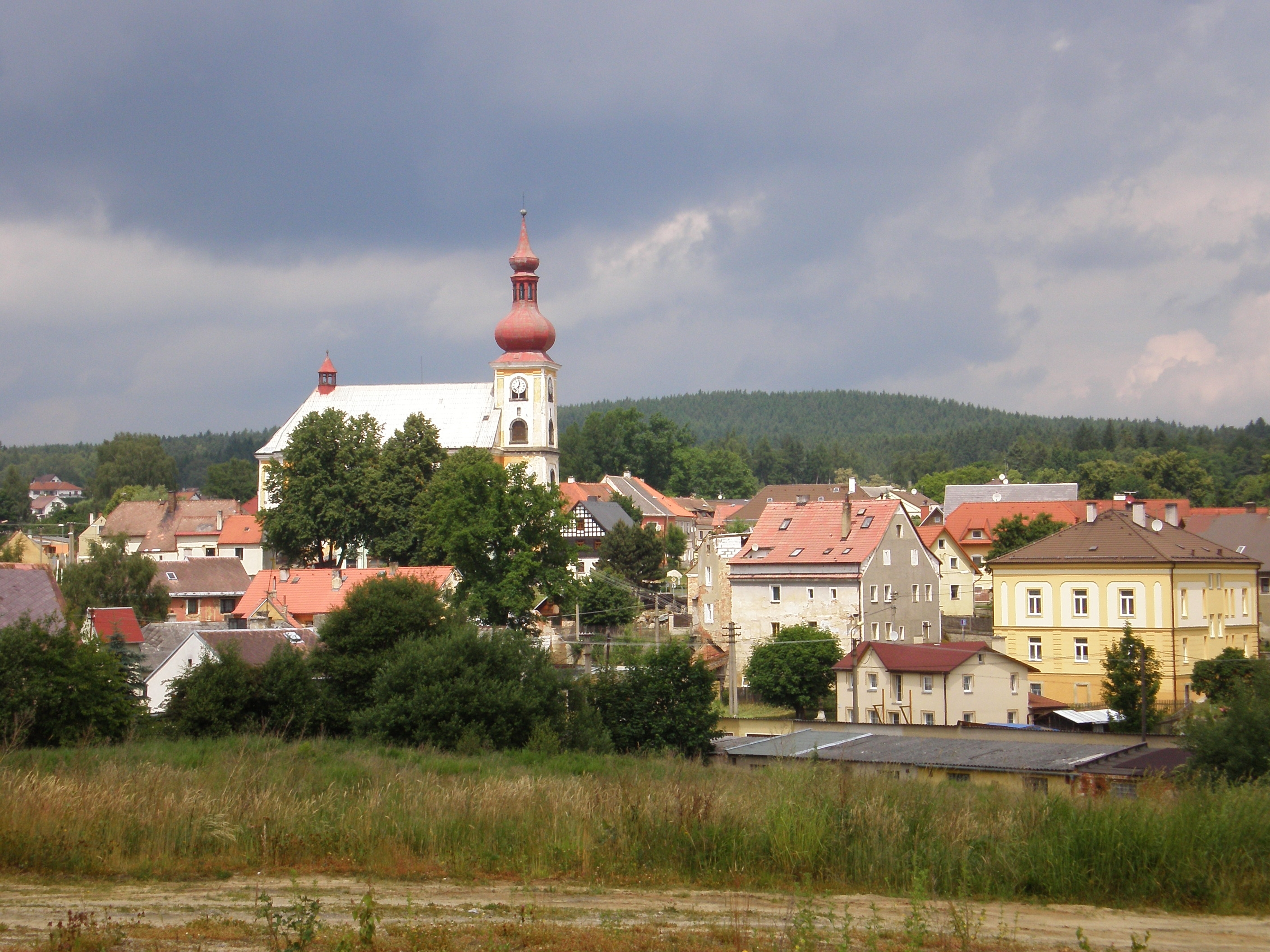
- View of the town

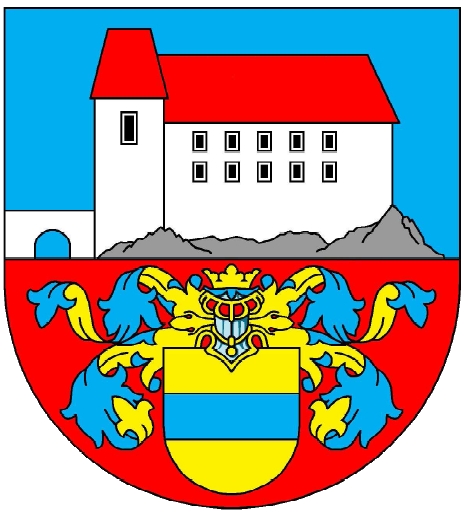
- Flag Coat of arms

- Location in the Czech Republic
- Coordinates: 50°10′14″N 12°21′41″E
- Country: Czech Republic
- Region: Karlovy Vary
- District: Cheb
- First mentioned: 1224

Government
  - Mayor: Rita Skalová (ODS)

Area
  - Total: 23.44 km^{2} (9.05 sq mi)
- Elevation: 465 m (1,526 ft)

Population (2026-01-01)
  - Total: 1,875
  - Density: 79.99/km^{2} (207.2/sq mi)
- Time zone: UTC+1 (CET)
  - Summer (DST): UTC+2 (CEST)
- Postal code: 351 34
- Website: www.skalna.cz

Skalná (Czech pronunciation: [ˈskalnaː]; until 1950 Vildštejn, German: Wildstein) is a town in Cheb District in the Karlovy Vary Region of the Czech Republic. It has about 1,900 inhabitants. It is known as the birthplace of the footballer Pavel Nedvěd.

== Administrative division ==
Skalná consists of five municipal parts (in brackets population according to the 2021 census):

- Skalná (1,610)
- Kateřina (34)
- Starý Rybník (160)
- Vonšov (111)
- Zelená (7)

== Etymology ==
The original German name Wildstein (i.e. 'wild rock') is most likely derived from the location of the town on a rocky promontory, and from the abundance of game in the forests. The Czech name Vildštejn was created by transcription. In 1950, the town was renamed Skalná (from skála, i.e. 'rock').

== Geography ==
Skalná is located about 10 kilometres (6 mi) north of Cheb and 35 km (22 mi) west of Karlovy Vary, on the border with Germany. The eastern part of the municipal territory lies in the Cheb Basin and the western part lies in the Fichtel Mountains. The highest point is the hill Lužský vrch at 606 m (1,988 ft) above sea level. The territory is rich in small fishponds and streams.

Skalná is known for the Soos National Nature Reserve, which is nicknamed "Czech Yellowstone". It is an extensive peat bog and moor, where a large number of mineral springs and pure carbon dioxide spring up in the form of mofettas. There is an educational trail leading along the bottom of a dry lake, which had salt water.

== History ==
The first written mention of Vildštejn is from 1224. The settlement was founded around 1200 in the sub-castle area of Vildštejn Castle. It was owned by various noble families, most notably by the Gumerauer family (1439–1524), by the Wirsberg family (1531–1590s), who made history not only as robbers, but also as builders of a new church and Renaissance castle, and by the Trauttenberg family (1590s–1799).

== Demographics ==
Historical population

Year	Pop.	±%
1869	4,011	—
1880	3,787	−5.6%
1890	3,625	−4.3%
1900	3,483	−3.9%
1910	3,813	+9.5%

Year	Pop.	±%
1921	3,384	−11.3%
1930	3,994	+18.0%
1950	1,847	−53.8%
1961	2,043	+10.6%
1970	1,839	−10.0%

Year	Pop.	±%
1980	1,708	−7.1%
1991	1,563	−8.5%
2001	1,670	+6.8%
2011	1,836	+9.9%
2021	1,922	+4.7%

Source: Censuses

== Transport ==
Skalná is located on the railway line Cheb–Luby.

== Sights ==
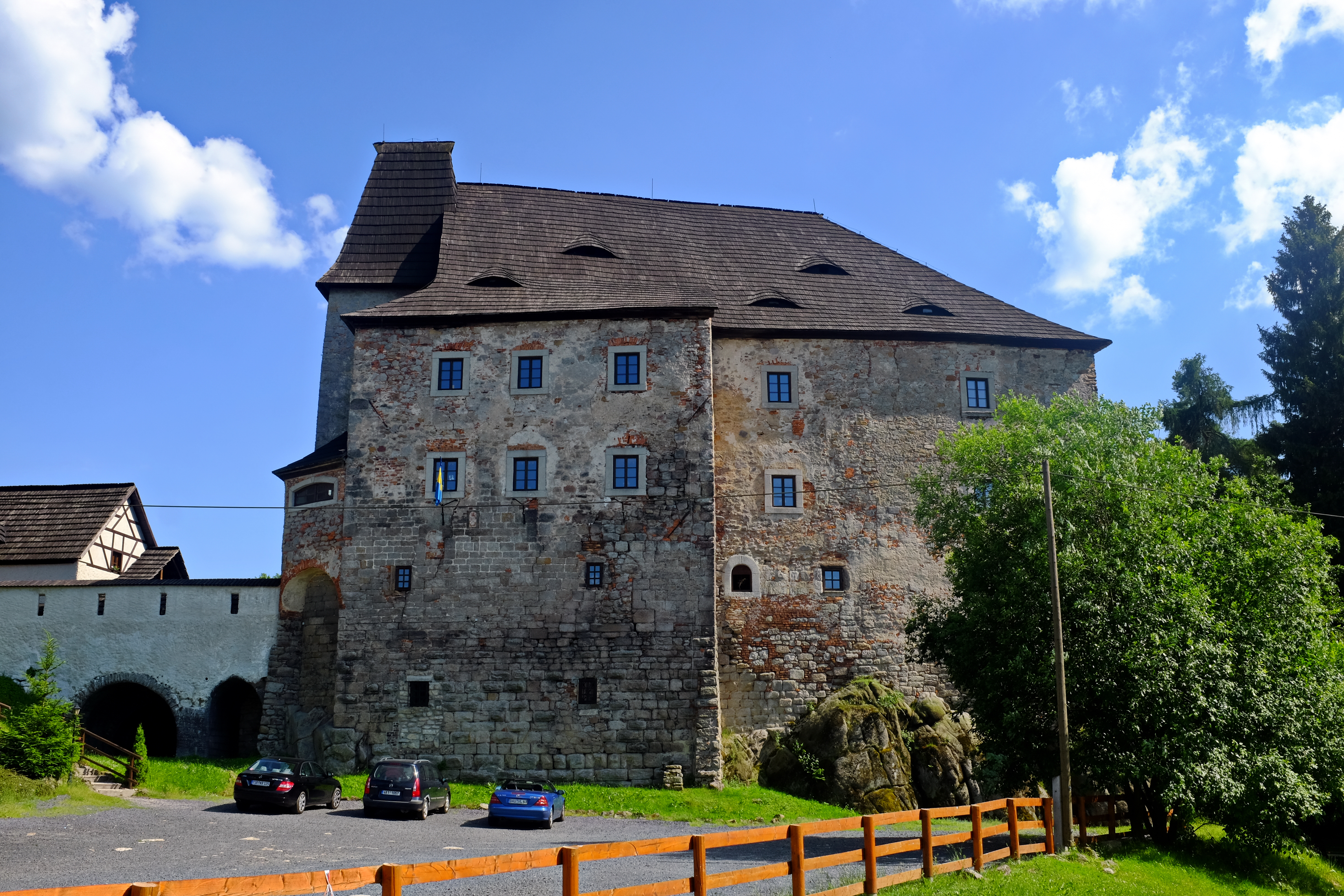
Vildštejn Castle

The Romanesque Vildštejn Castle was founded in 1166. It was inhabited until the 19th century, when it was transformed into a malting plant. Today it is a museum.

The Church of Saint John the Baptist was originally a Gothic structure founded by the Teutonic Order, first mentioned in 1320. In 1705–1709, it was rebuilt in the Baroque style.

In Starý Rybník are ruins of a Gothic castle, built in the mid-14th century. After the fire in 1792, a new aristocratic residence was built next to the medieval castle in 1823–1826. Two ground-floor rooms (probably a prison), perimeter walls and the rest of the corner tower have been preserved from the old castle. Both castles are privately owned and inaccessible.

== Notable people ==
- Sigmund von Birken (1626–1681), German poet
- Johann Goldfuß (1908–1970), German luthier
- Pavel Nedvěd (born 1972), footballer

== Twin towns – sister cities ==
Skalná is twinned with:

- Neusorg, Germany
