= Leopold Widhalm =

Austrian luthier (1722–1776)

Martin Leopold Widhalm (October 2, 1722 – June 10, 1776) was an Austrian or German luthier known for his work in Nuremberg. Charles Beare considers Widhalm to have been the most significant maker of violins in Germany during the 18th century not to be based in Mittenwald, and praises the "sharpness and good taste" of his instruments.

Born in Horn, Austria, Widhalm worked on many old Bologna lutes that inspired his later work in his manufacture of lutes, violins and violoncellos in Nuremberg, Germany between 1746 and 1776. Widhalm moved permanently to Nuremberg in 1745 to work at the instrument-making shop of the late Sebastian Schelle (1676–1744) being run by his eldest daughter Barbara. Another source considers Widhalm to have been a student of Schelle. Widhalm and Barbara Schelle's working relationship became personal and resulted in marriage the following year. However, a prolonged legal battle ensued with Leonhard Maussiell (1685–1760), who objected to Widhalm taking over the business. When legal matters finally ended, Leopold and Barbara Widhalm created the largest and most successful lute and violin manufacturing operation in Nuremberg, noted for their outstanding quality. According to Beare, Widhalm was influenced by Jacob Stainer.

Following his death in 1776 and her death in 1781, their sons Martin Leopold Widhalm (1747–1806) and Gallus Ignatius Widhalm (1752–1822) took over from him and a grandson, Johann Martin Leopold Widhalm (1799–1855) too became involved in the business.
