= Charles Mennégand =

Eminent French luthier and a distinguished repairer of violins, violas, and cellos

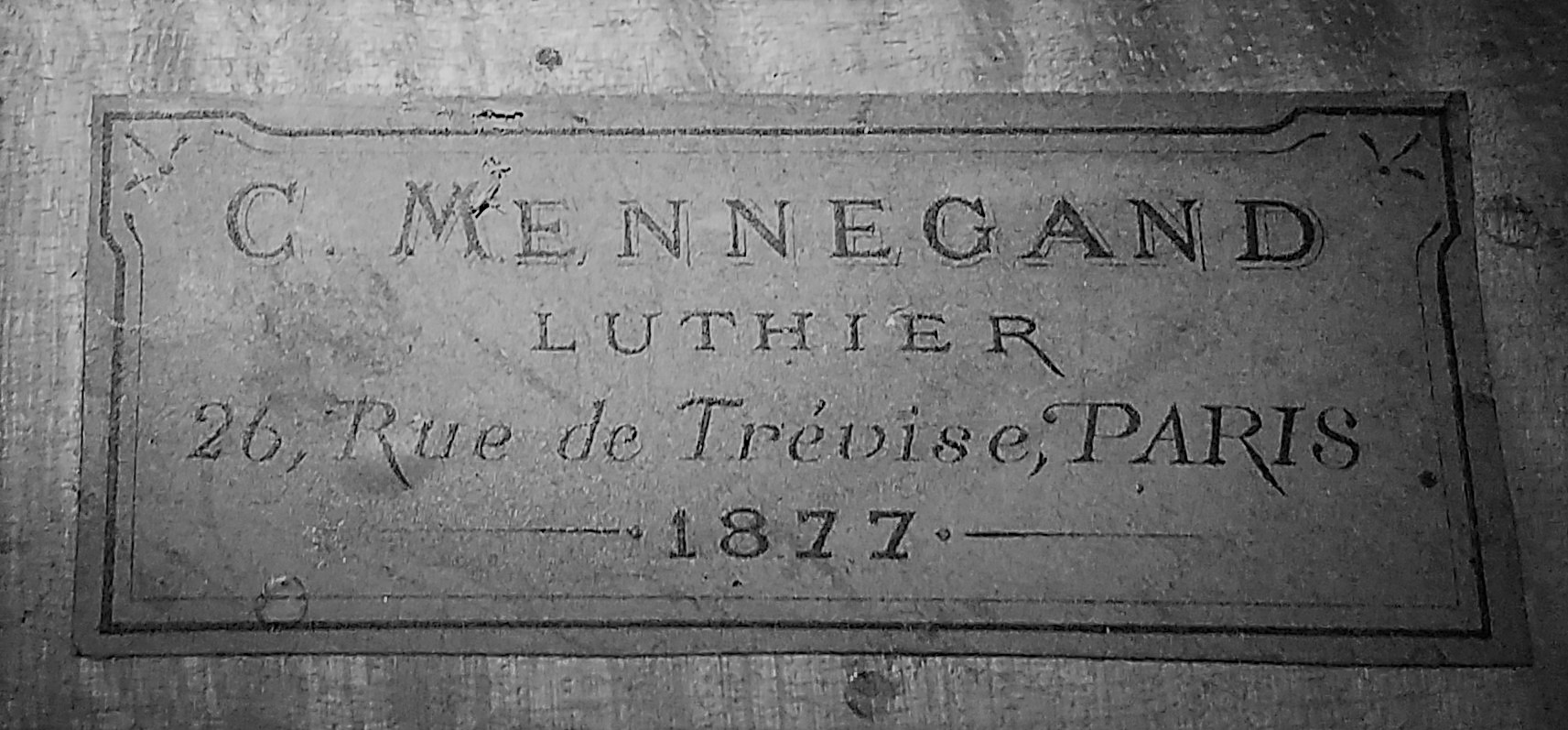
Instrument label of Charles Mennégand

Charles Mennégand (19 June 1822 – 9 January 1885) was a French luthier and a repairer of violins, violas, and cellos. He is considered a superb 19th century French maker of cellos and is consistently counted among the handful of great French makers.

== Early life ==
Charles Mennégand was born in Nancy on 19 June 1822. He apprenticed in Mirecourt. In 1840 Mennégand began working with Claude Victor Rambaux at Faubourg Poissonnière in Paris, and remained there for five years. He likely worked in Turin, Italy in the second half of the 1840s. He worked with Charles Maucotel from 1851–52, then moved to Amsterdam in 1852 to establish his own independent shop.

== Career ==
Charles Mennégand was a prolific instrument maker during his years in Amsterdam. He returned to Paris in 1857 and established his shop at 26 rue de Trevise, just north of the Conservatoire de Paris. In Paris, his work was largely concerned with making cellos and with repairs and restoration for which he gained renown and won premier place. Like Rambaux, Mennegand was known for cutting down Golden Age Italian cellos which were viewed as too large to meet the demands of the then modern technical standards. This practice has come to be viewed as barbaric, but Mennégand was noted for the clever delicacy with which he did his first class work. This and his other repair work earned him the designation "consummate repairman".

Mennégand's own cellos are "particularly valued" and "sought after". In A Dictionary of Violin Makers, Cecie Stainer wrote "after his return to Paris [Mennégand] principally made violoncellos, which rank among the best work of the time." Mennégand mostly used Stradivari patterns though he experimented with slightly altered forms. His instruments are characterized as rich and powerfully brilliant. They owe much of their projecting power to the front plate's depth; this modification was the fruition of experiments with Rambaux in the early 1840s.

Charles Mennégand used a reddish-brown spirit varnish with golden highlights and particular carefully chosen wood of an even and medium grain. He signed his work internally "C. Mennegand" or used printed labels reading Mennégand / Luthier / 26 rue de Trévise, Paris or C. Mennégand luthier / 26, rue de Trévise, Paris.

In the Universal Dictionary of Violin and Bow Makers, William Henley noted "the critical and judicious labour of this eminent maker deserves universal admiration," and that Mennégand's instruments possess a "tonal quality establishing the real desideratum in bright sonority."

Charles Mennégand died on 9 January 1885 in Villers-Cotterets.

== Awards ==
- Medal of the 2nd Class, Expositions universelles de Paris, 1855
- Bronze Medal, Expositions universelles de Paris, 1867
- Bronze Medal, Paris Exhibition, 1878
- Premier Place for Repairing
