= Joan Maria da Bressa =

Brescian lyre maker

Joan Maria da Bressa was a Brescian lyre maker active in Venice in the first decades of the 16th century. One of the best lyres in the world made by him, with a very fine decorated and gilt head (palette) dated around 1525 by David Boyden, but more probably of the middle of the century, is now in the Ashmolean Museum in Oxford. Some scholars claim that he was the father of Giovan Giacomo Dalla Corna. A Zuanmaria de Antonio Bressan dai violini is found in some venetian documents dating from 1562 to 1601 testifying his work also like a maker of violini, lire e lironi. Another man with similar name is Joan Maria Dalla Corna, father of Jo Jacobo Dalla Corna, a brescian maker born around 1484.
