= Sanctus Seraphin =

Venetian luthier (1699 - 1776)

Sanctus Seraphin (Udine 1699 – Venice 1776), also known as Santo Serafin, was a successful luthier (violin maker), working in Venice. He closed his bottega (workshop) in 1741 but he continued to work in the bottega of Giorgio Serafin, his nephew, till his death in 1776. It is still unknown where he learned the art of violin making. His models were inspired by the Cremonese luthier Nicolò Amati.

Seraphin's stringed instruments use a varnish that ranges in color from golden brown to an orange red. The varnish is usually transparent, lustrous and soft, but occasionally displays a hard, dry and crackled appearance.

A Seraphin violin ranges in value from $20,000 to $850,000, depending on condition and provenance. The auction record for Sanctus Seraphin was $779,531 in 2018, for a cello. Approximately 300 Seraphin instruments are known to exist.
