= Giuseppe Bernardo Lecchi =

Italian luthier (1895–1967)

Giuseppe Bernardo Lecchi (b. Felizzano 20 August 1895– d. Genoa 24 August 1967) was an Italian violin maker.

Originally from a Piedmontese village near Alessandria, Lecchi showed great talent for woodworking at a young age. In 1924, he took over De Barbieri’s place in Cesare Candi’s workshop.

Lecchi proved to be an ideal partner for Candi and made a considerable contribution to his last series of decorated instruments, taking charge of the delicate inlays.

By 1937, Lecchi was at his peak winning first prize for a quartet at the Stradivari bicentennial exhibition in Cremona. "His was a more ‘classical’ taste than that of all the other Genoese makers, and his way of making the Stradivari model was elegant and well balanced."

Later on, he was given the honor of serving as official curator to Nicolo Paganini’s del Gesù “Cannon” violin, which still belongs to the city of Genoa.

Most of his violins don’t bear the sharp edges and consistent archings of modern Genoese instruments. Lecchi used Candi’s continuous lining technique only in his early period; soon after he began making the interiors in the traditional way, with the central linings mortised or simply set into the centre-blocks.
