= The Strad =

UK classical music magazine

- Cover of the December 2024 issue
- Editor: Emma Baker
- Categories: Music magazine
- Frequency: Monthly
- First issue: June 1890
- Company: Newsquest
- Country: United Kingdom
- Based in: London
- Language: English
- Website: www.thestrad.com
- ISSN: 0039-2049

The Strad is a UK-based monthly classical music magazine about string instruments – principally the violin, viola, cello, and double bass – for amateur and professional musicians. Founded in 1889, the magazine provides information, photographs and reviews of instruments, related feature articles and news, and information about concerts. The magazine offers practical advice on technique, profiles of leading performers, and information on master classes and the craft of instrument makers such as luthiers. It also includes articles about orchestras and music schools.

The magazine's name references the common abbreviation for the famous 17th–18th-century Stradivarius family of luthiers and their coveted and valuable instruments. The Strad's first issue was released in June 1890. It is now edited by Emma Baker and owned by Newsquest Specialist Media Limited, an USA Today Co. company.
