= Matteo Sellas =

German luthier

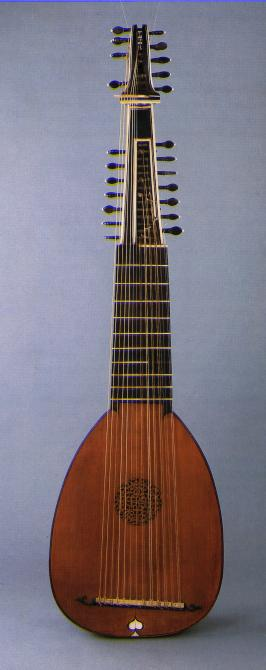
Archlute by Matteo Sellas

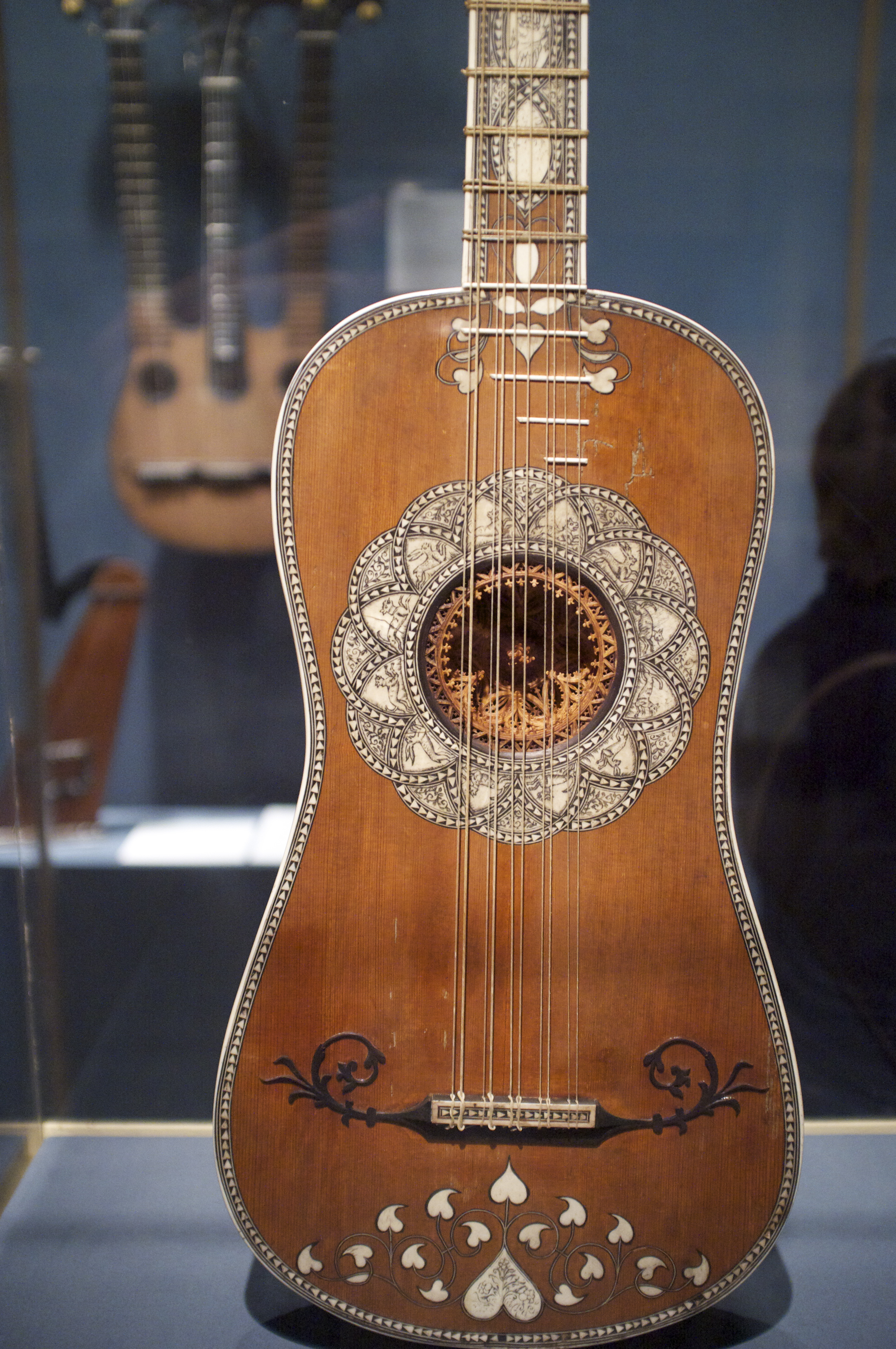
Baroque guitar by Matteo Sellas

Matteo Sellas (sometimes also written Mateo Sellas or in original German Matthäus Seelos) was a German luthier born in 1580 in Füssen who worked in Venice from 1620–1650 and is best known for building lutes, archlutes and baroque guitars.
