= Nobuhiro Sonoda =

Nobuhiro Sonoda is a luthier of reputation, born in Tokyo, 1949, working and residing in Chiba, Japan, since 1999.

His training was at Soroku Murata in Tokyo and Mittenwald School in Germany, where he passed his master's degree in 1982 under Josef Kantuscher.

He won a bronze medal in 1984.

He won the gold medal of the same year's Antonio Stradivari international Violin Making Competition and was in the jury of the same Competition in 2006.
