= Martin Hoffmann (luthier) =

Martin Hoffmann (1653–1719) was an important German luthier, based in Leipzig. He was the father of Johann Christian Hoffmann (1683–1750), an important luthier, violin maker, and a friend and associate of Johann Sebastian Bach.
