= Valentino Siani =

Italian luthier (c.1595–1672)

Valentino Siani (c.1595–1672) was an Italian violinmaker who worked in Brescia and Florence.

He was a pupil of Giovanni Paolo Maggini in Brescia (c.1610–1620) before he moved to Florence in c.1620 where he worked c.1620–1670.

Sianis' instruments have a rather full arching, narrow purfling in very nicely channelled edges, and stiff f-holes. His scrolls show the influence of Maggini.

His work is very rarely met in the trade. He is particularly well known for his violas.

A viola by Valentino Siani is pictured in Italian Violinmakers by Walter Hamma.
