= Luthier =

Craftsman of stringed musical instruments

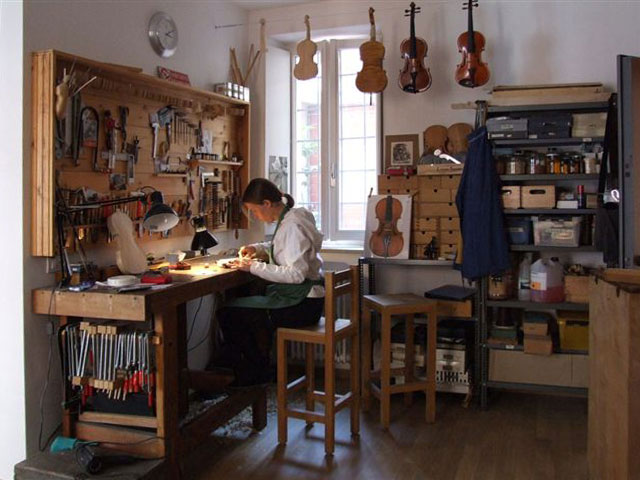
- Modern luthier's workshop, Cremona (2007)

Occupation
- Occupation type: Instrument maker, instrument repairer

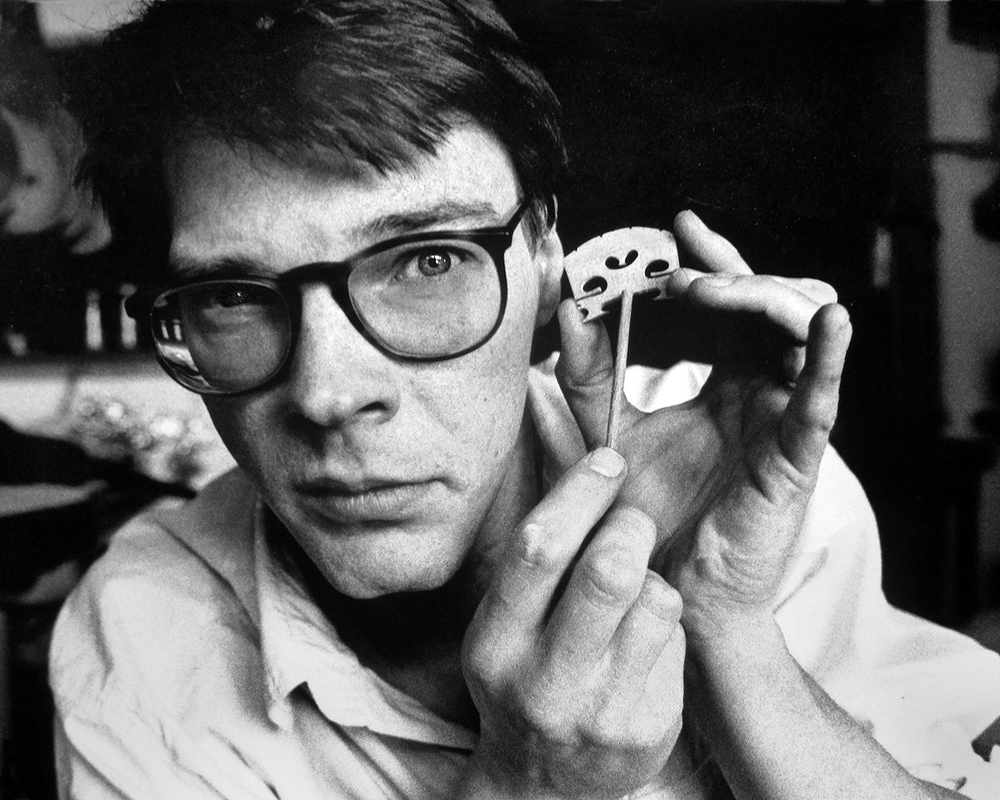
A luthier tunes the bridge of a violin.

A luthier (/ˈluːtiər/ LOO-tee-ər, US also /ˈluːθiər/ LOO-thee-ər) is a craftsperson who builds or repairs string instruments.

== Etymology ==
The word luthier is originally French and comes from luth, the French word for "lute". The term was originally used for makers of lutes, but it came to be used in French for makers of most bowed and plucked stringed instruments such as members of the violin family (including violas, cellos, and double basses) and guitars. Luthiers, however, do not make harps or pianos; these require different skills and construction methods because their strings are secured to a frame.

== Craft ==
The craft of luthiers, lutherie (rarely called "luthiery"; but this often refers to stringed instruments other than those in the violin family), is commonly divided into the two main categories of makers of stringed instruments that are plucked or strummed and makers of stringed instruments that are bowed. Since bowed instruments require a bow, the second category includes a subtype known as a bow maker or archetier. Luthiers may also teach string-instrument making, either through apprenticeship or formal classroom instruction.

== Plucked strings ==
=== Lutes ===
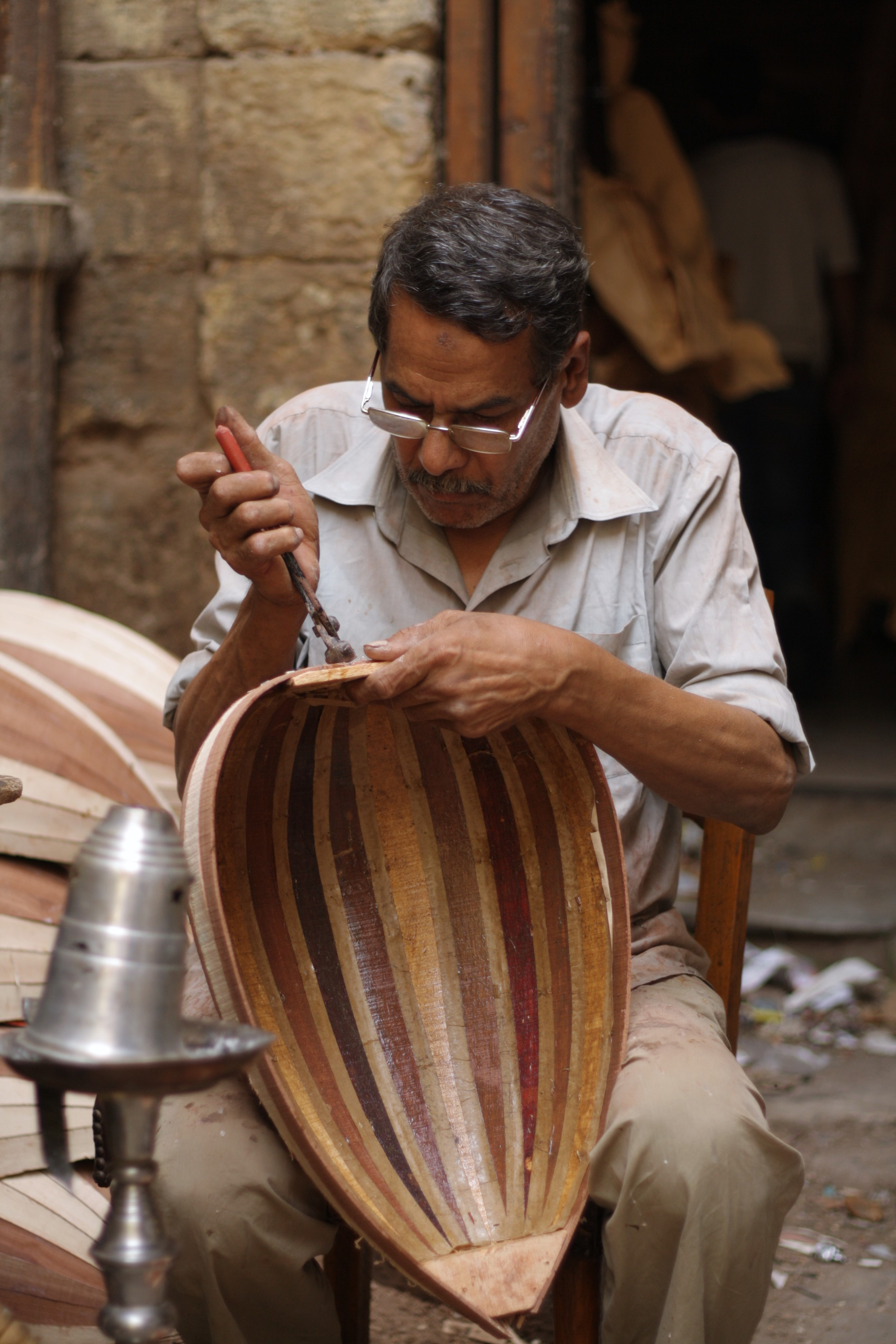
An Oud luthier on Mohamed Ali Street in Cairo, Egypt is making the bowl section of the Oud

Early producers of lutes, archlutes, theorbos and vihuelas include the Tieffenbrucker family, Martin Hoffmann and Matteo Sellas.

=== Guitars ===
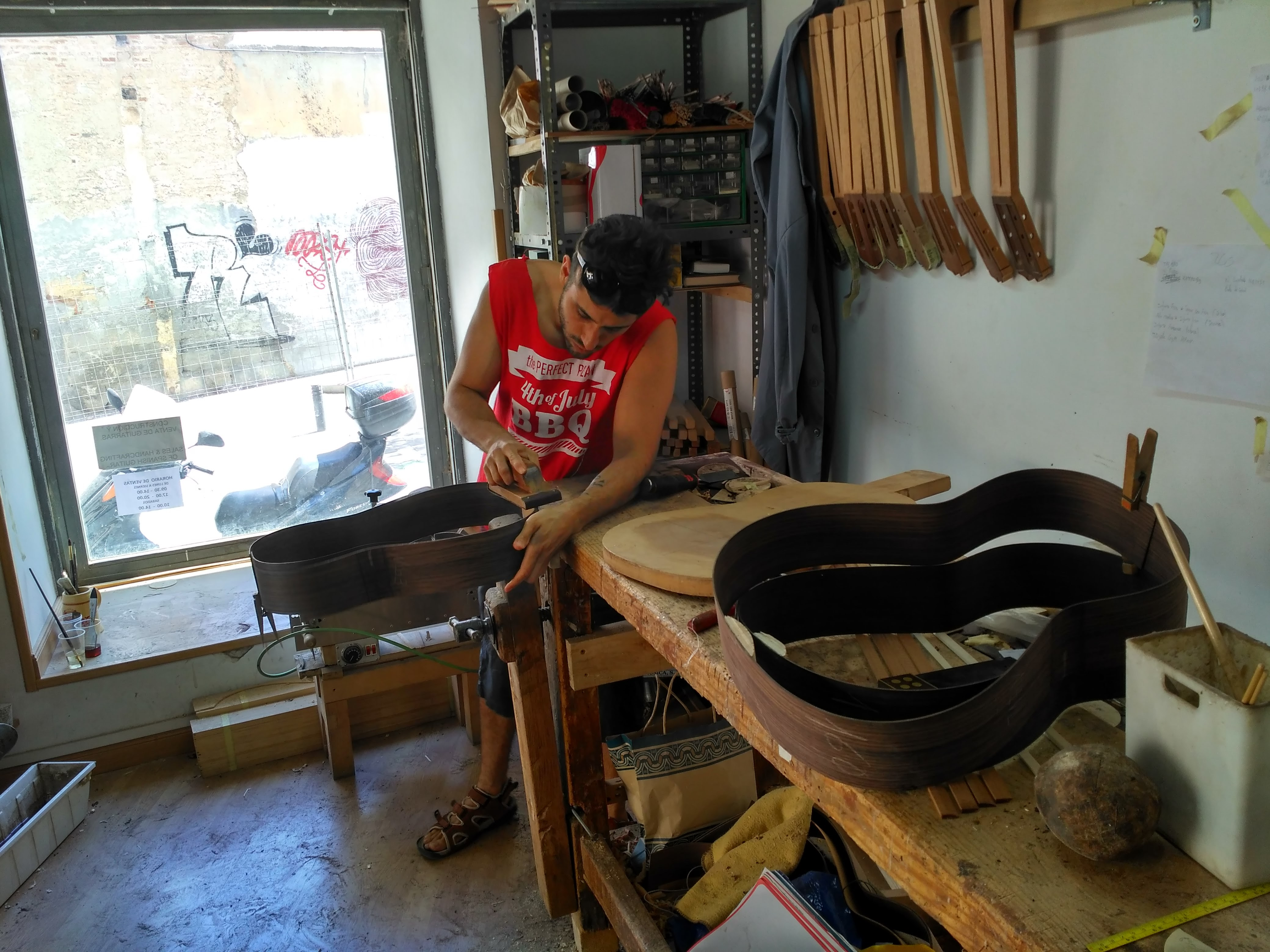
A luthier in Madrid, Spain is making the side section of classical guitar body

Two luthiers of the early 19th century connected with the development of the modern classical guitar are Louis Panormo and Georg Staufer. Antonio Torres Jurado is credited with developing the form of classical guitar still in use. C.F. Martin of Germany developed a form that evolved into the modern steel-string acoustic guitar.

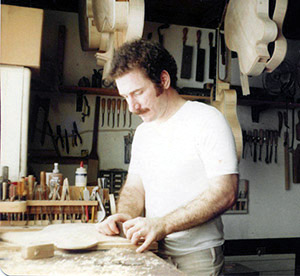
American guitar luthier Robert Benedetto is levelling a guitar soundboard in his studio (c. 1976)

The American luthier Orville Gibson specialized in mandolins, and is credited with creating the archtop guitar. The 20th-century American luthiers John D'Angelico and Jimmy D'Aquisto made archtop guitars. Lloyd Loar worked briefly for the Gibson Guitar Corporation making mandolins and guitars. His designs for a family of arch top instruments (mandolin, mandola, guitar, et cetera) are held in high esteem by today's luthiers, who seek to reproduce their sound. C. F. Martin apprenticed to Johann Georg Stauffer, a guitar maker in Vienna, Austria and Martin & Co. was born, with the X bracing being developed in the 1850s. Martin & Co still produce acoustic guitars. Paul Bigsby's innovation of the tremolo arm for archtop and electric guitars is still in use and may have influenced Leo Fender's design for the Stratocaster solid-body electric guitar, as well as the Jaguar and Jazzmaster. Concurrent with Fender's work, guitarist Les Paul independently developed a solid-body electric guitar. These were the first fretted, solid-body electric guitars—though they were preceded by the cast aluminum "frying pan", a solid-body electric lap steel guitar developed and eventually patented by George Beauchamp, and built by Adolph Rickenbacher. A company founded by luthier Friedrich Gretsch and continued by his son and grandson, Fred and Fred, Jr., originally made banjos, but now mainly produces electric guitars.

== Bowed strings ==
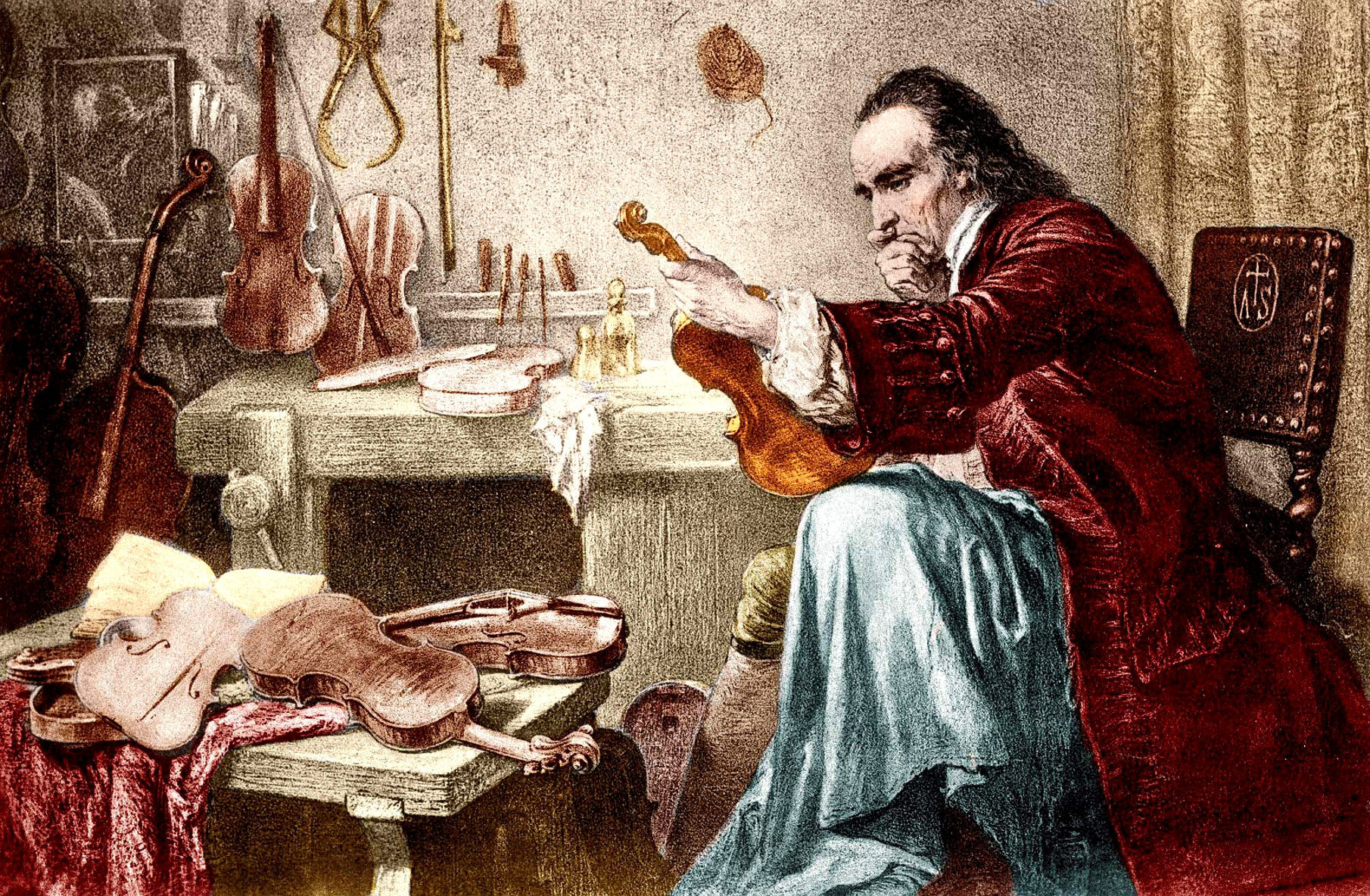
An engraver's impression of Antonio Stradivari examining an instrument

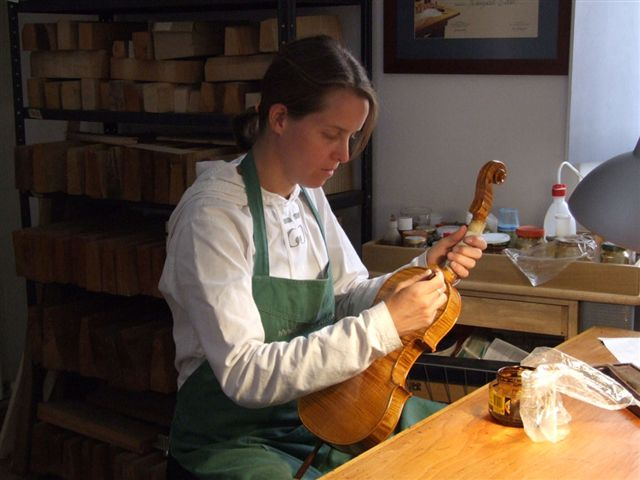
Contemporary luthier varnishing a violin

Bowed instruments include: cello, crwth, double bass, erhu, fiddle, hudok, morin khuur, nyckelharpa, hurdy-gurdy, rabab, rebec, sarangi, viol (viola da gamba), viola, viola da braccio, viola d'amore, and violin.

The purported inventor of the violin is Andrea Amati. Amati was originally a lute maker, but turned to the new instrument form of violin in the mid-16th century. He was the progenitor of the Amati family of luthiers active in Cremona, Italy until the 18th century. Andrea Amati had two sons. His eldest was Antonio Amati (circa 1537–1607), and the younger, Girolamo Amati (circa 1561–1630). Girolamo is better known as Hieronymus, and together with his brother, produced many violins with labels inside the instrument reading "A&H". Antonio died having no known offspring, but Hieronymus became a father. His son Nicolò (1596–1684) was himself a master luthier who had several apprentices of note, including Antonio Stradivari (probably), Andrea Guarneri, Bartolomeo Pasta, Jacob Railich, Giovanni Battista Rogeri, Matthias Klotz, and possibly Jacob Stainer and Francesco Rugeri. It is even possible Bartolomeo Cristofori, later inventor of the piano, apprenticed under him (although census data does not support this, which paints this as a possible myth).

Gasparo Duiffopruggar of Füssen, Germany, was once incorrectly credited as the inventor of the violin. He was likely a maker, but no documentation survives, and no instruments survive that experts unequivocally know are his.

Gasparo da Salò of Brescia (Italy) was another early luthier of the violin family. About 80 of his instruments survive, and around 100 documents that relate to his work. He was also a double bass player and son and nephew of two violin players: Francesco and Agosti, respectively.

Da Salò made many instruments and exported to France and Spain, and probably to England. He had at least five apprentices: his son Francesco, a helper named Battista, Alexander of Marsiglia, Giacomo Lafranchini and Giovanni Paolo Maggini. Maggini inherited da Salò's business in Brescia. Valentino Siani worked with Maggini. In 1620, Maggini moved to Florence.

=== By century ===
==== 17th ====
Luthiers born in the mid-17th century include Giovanni Grancino, Vincenzo Rugeri, Carlo Giuseppe Testore, and his sons Carlo Antonio Testore and Paolo Antonio Testore, all from Milan. From Venice the luthiers Matteo Goffriller, Domenico Montagnana, Sanctus Seraphin, and Carlo Annibale Tononi were principals in the Venetian school of violin making (although the latter began his career in Bologna). Carlo Bergonzi (luthier) purchased Antonio Stradivari's shop a few years after the master's death. David Tecchler, who was born in Austria, later worked in both Venice and Rome.

==== 18th ====
Luthiers from the early 18th century include Nicolò Gagliano of Naples, Italy, Carlo Ferdinando Landolfi of Milan, and Giovanni Battista Guadagnini, who roamed throughout Italy during his lifetime. From Austria originally, Leopold Widhalm later established himself in Nürnberg, Germany.

The Jérôme-Thibouville-Lamy firm started making wind instruments around 1730 at La Couture-Boussey, then moved to Mirecourt around 1760 and started making violins, guitars, mandolins, and musical accessories.

==== 19th ====
The early 19th-century luthiers of the Mirecourt school of violin making in France were the Vuillaume family, Charles Jean Baptiste Collin-Mezin, and Collin-Mezin's son, Charles Collin-Mezin, Jr., Honore Derazey, Nicolas Lupot, Charles Macoutel, Charles Mennégand, and Pierre Silvestre. Nicola Utili (also known as Nicola da Castel Bolognese) (Ravenna, Italy, 1888–1962), beside traditional lute works, experimented the making of "pear-shaped" violins.

== See also ==
- List of luthiers
- Tonewood
- Experimental luthier
- Category:Lutherie reference books
- Paracho de Verduzco
