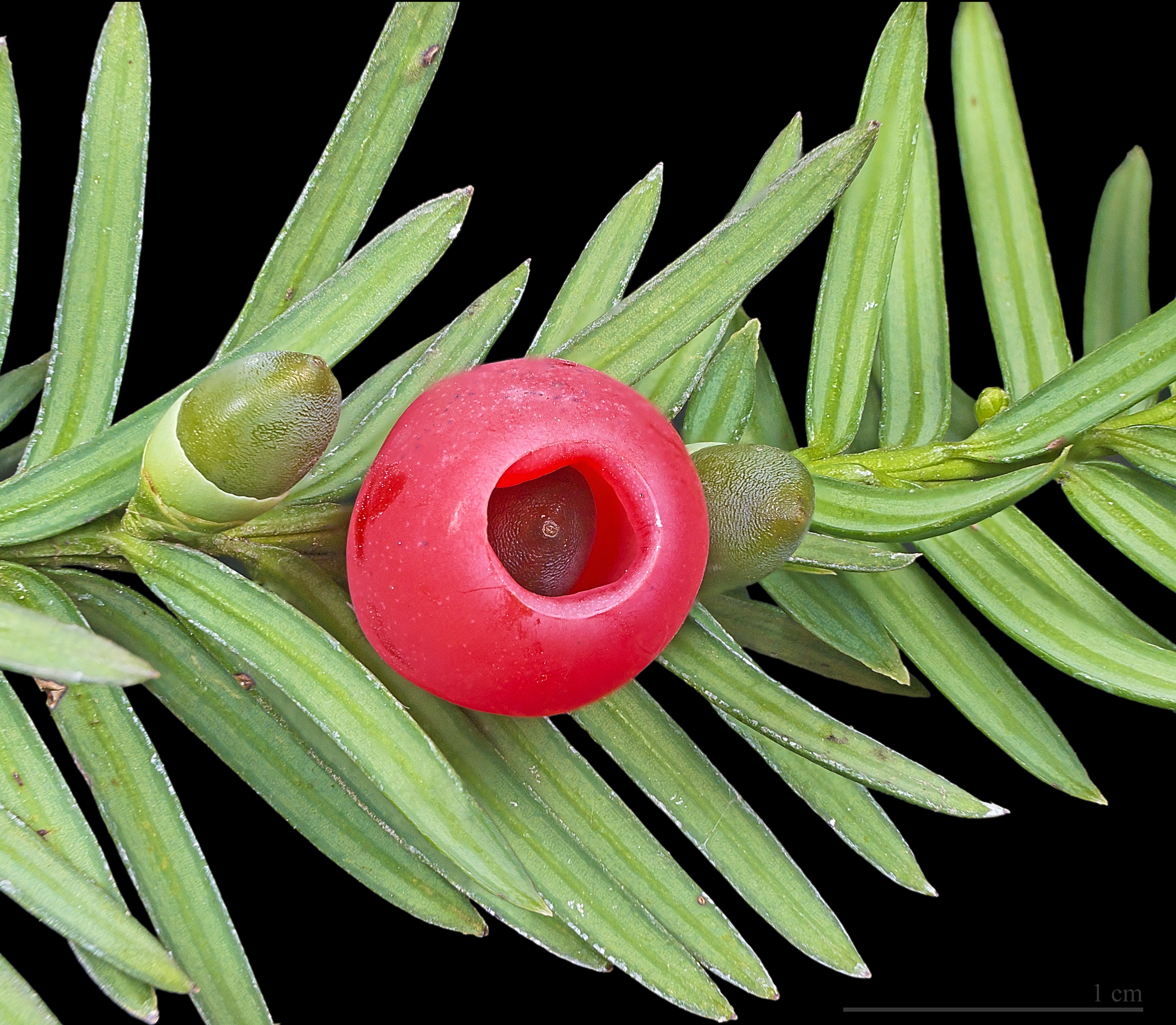
- Shoot with immature cones, and a mature cone with a fleshy aril, the only non-toxic part of the plant

Conservation status
- Least Concern (IUCN 3.1)

Scientific classification
- Kingdom: Plantae
- Clade: Tracheophytes
- Clade: Gymnosperms
- Division: Pinophyta
- Class: Pinopsida
- Order: Cupressales
- Family: Taxaceae
- Genus: Taxus
- Species: T. baccata

Binomial name
- Taxus baccata L.
- Native range ✖ Isolated population Introduced and naturalised area ▲ Isolated population

Synonyms
- List: Cephalotaxus adpressa Beissn.; Cephalotaxus brevifolia Beissn.; Cephalotaxus tardiva Siebold ex Endl.; Taxus adpressa Carrière; Taxus aure K.Koch; Taxus baccata f. aurea (J.Nelson) Pilg.; Taxus baccata f. dovastoniana (Leight.) Rehder; Taxus baccata f. elegantissima (C.Lawson) Beissn.; Taxus baccata f. erecta (Loudon) Pilg.; Taxus baccata f. ericoides (Carrière) Pilg.; Taxus baccata f. expansa (Carrière) Rehder; Taxus baccata f. glauca (Jacques ex Carrière) Beissn.; Taxus baccata f. linearis (Carrière) Pilg.; Taxus baccata f. lutea Rehder; Taxus baccata f. pendula (J.Nelson) Pilg.; Taxus baccata f. pendula-graciosa (Overeynder) Beissn.; Taxus baccata f. pyramidalis (C.Lawson) Beissn.; Taxus baccata f. repandens (Parsons) Rehder; Taxus baccata f. semperaurea (Dallim.) Rehder; Taxus baccata f. stricta (C.Lawson) Rehder; Taxus baccata f. variegata (Weston) Rehder; Taxus baccata f. xanthocarpa Kuntze; Taxus baccata var. adpressa-aurea A.Henry; Taxus baccata var. cavendishii Hornibr.; Taxus baccata var. dovastoniana Leight.; Taxus baccata var. dovastonii-aurea Sénécl.; Taxus baccata var. dovastonii-aureovariegata Beissn.; Taxus baccata var. dovastonii-variegata Gordon; Taxus baccata var. elegantissima C.Lawson; Taxus baccata var. I Loudon; Taxus baccata var. glauca Jacques ex Carrière; Taxus baccata var. lutea Endl.; Taxus baccata var. macrocarpa Lavallée; Taxus baccata var. pendula-overeynderi Fitschen; Taxus baccata var. prostrata Bean; Taxus baccata var. pyramidalis C.Lawson; Taxus baccata var. variegata Weston; Taxus baccifera Theophr. ex Bubani; Taxus columnaris K.Koch; Taxus baccifera Theophr. ex Bubani; Taxus columnaris K.Koch; Taxus communis J.Nelson; Taxus communis var. pyramidalis (hort. ex Ravenscr., C. Lawson et al.) Nelson; Taxus disticha Wender. ex Henkel & Hochst.; Taxus dovastonii Carrière; Taxus elegantissima Carrière; Taxus elvastonensis Beissn.; Taxus empetrifolia Gordon; Taxus erecta Carrière; Taxus ericoides Carrière; Taxus expansa K.Koch; Taxus fastigiata Lindl.; Taxus foxii Carrière; Taxus hibernica Hook. ex Loudon; Taxus horizontalis Carrière; Taxus imperialis Gordon; Taxus jacksonii K.Koch; Taxus lugubris Salisb.; Taxus marginata Carrière; Taxus michelii Carrière; Taxus microphylla Gordon; Taxus mitchellii Carrière; Taxus monstrosa Gordon; Taxus nana Parl.; Taxus parvifolia Wender.; Taxus pectinata Gilib.; Taxus pendula Carrière; Taxus pyramidalis (hort. ex Ravenscr., C. Lawson et al.) Severin; Taxus pyramidalis Carrière; Taxus recurvata C.Lawson; Taxus sparsifolia Loudon; Taxus tardiva (Siebold ex Endl.) C.Lawson; Taxus variegata Carrière; Taxus virgata Wall. ex Gordon; Verataxus adpressa (Carrière) Carrière

= Taxus baccata =

Species of conifer

Taxus baccata is a species of coniferous tree in the family Taxaceae. It is the tree originally known as yew, though to distinguish it from related species it is sometimes called common yew, European yew, or, in North America, English yew. It is a woodland tree in its native range, which spans much of Europe and parts of West Asia, the Caucasus and Northwest Africa. All parts of the plant except the fleshy aril are poisonous, with toxins that can be absorbed through inhalation, ingestion, and transpiration through the skin.

The wood has been prized for making longbows and for musical instruments such as lutes. Yews are often grown as ornamental trees, hedges or topiaries, including in churchyards, where they sometimes reach great age; many explanations have been given for this planting, especially that the yew is associated with death, immortality, and rebirth. Some place names derive from the Proto-Celtic *eburos, but scholars disagree as to whether this meant the yew tree.

== Taxonomy ==
The species Taxus baccata was first described in 1753 by Carl Linnaeus in his Species Plantarum. The name remains accepted, despite the many descriptions by later taxonomists, resulting in 108 synonyms. Linnaeus created the generic name Taxus, perhaps from the Greek toxon, a bow.

The word yew is from Old English īw, ēow, ultimately from Proto-Indo-European *h₁eyHw-, via Proto-Germanic *iwo, which also gave rise to Celtic forms such as Old Irish ēo, Welsh ywen. It became Old English iw, eow and Middle English eu. Baccata is Latin for 'bearing berries'.

== Description ==
Yews are small to medium-sized trees, growing up to 10–20 metres (35–65 ft) or exceptionally 28 m (92 ft) tall, with a trunk up to 2 m (6 1/2 ft) or exceptionally 4 m (13 ft) in diameter. The bark is thin, scaly reddish-brown, and comes off in small flakes aligned with the stem. The leaves are flat, dark green, 1–4 centimetres (1/2–1 1/2 in) long, 2–3 millimetres (1/16–1/8 in) broad, and arranged spirally on the stem, but with the leaf bases twisted to align the leaves in two flat rows on either side of the stem, except on erect leading shoots where the spiral arrangement is more obvious.

The seed cones are modified, each cone containing a single seed, which is 4–7 mm (3/16–1/4 in) long and almost surrounded by a fleshy scale which develops into a soft, bright red berry-like aril. The aril is 8–15 mm (5/16–9/16 in) long and wide and open at the end. The arils mature 6 to 9 months after pollination.

The aril is gelatinous and very sweet tasting. The male cones are globose, 3–6 mm (1/8–1/4 in) in diameter, and shed their pollen in early spring. Yews are mostly dioecious with male and female cones on separate trees, but occasional individuals can be variably monoecious, or change sex with time.

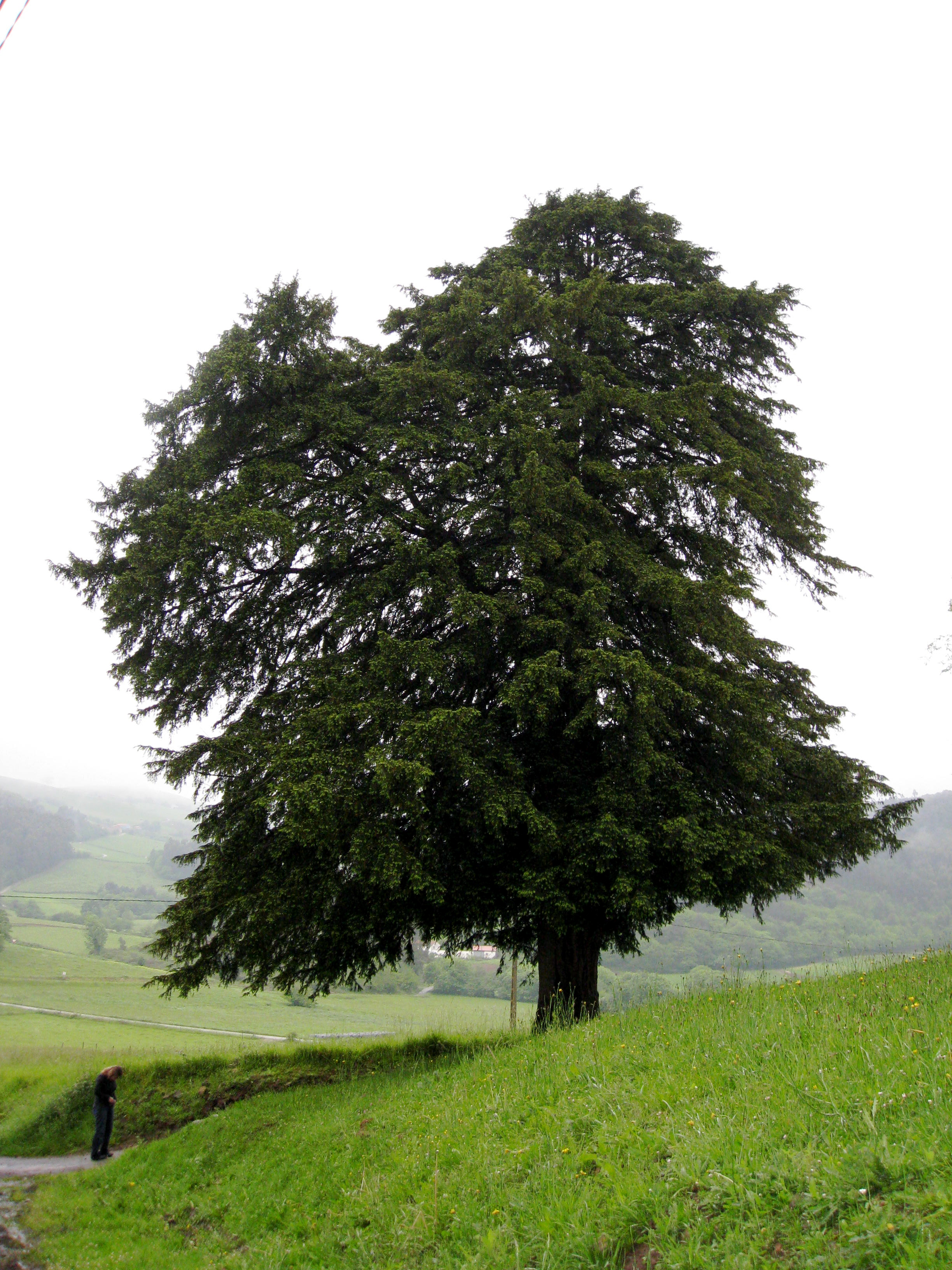
Habit

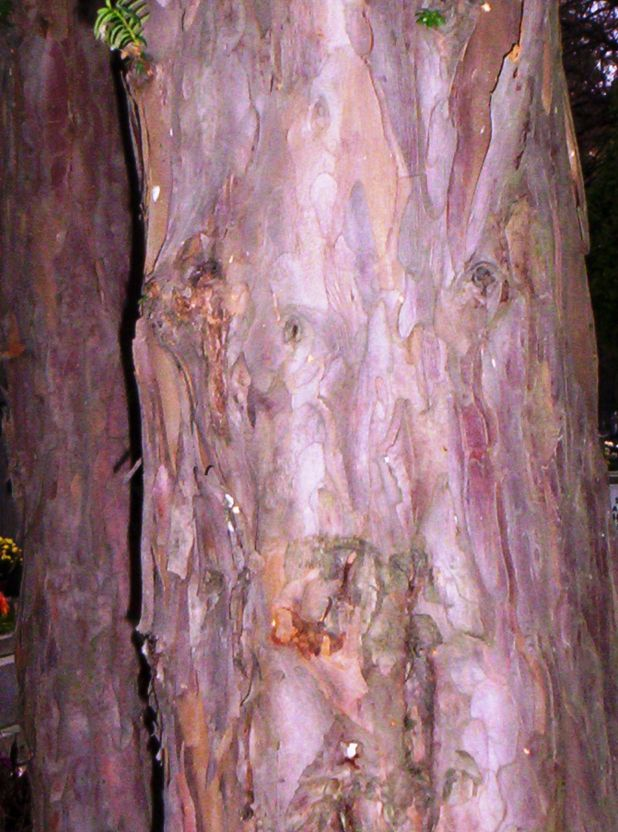
Bark

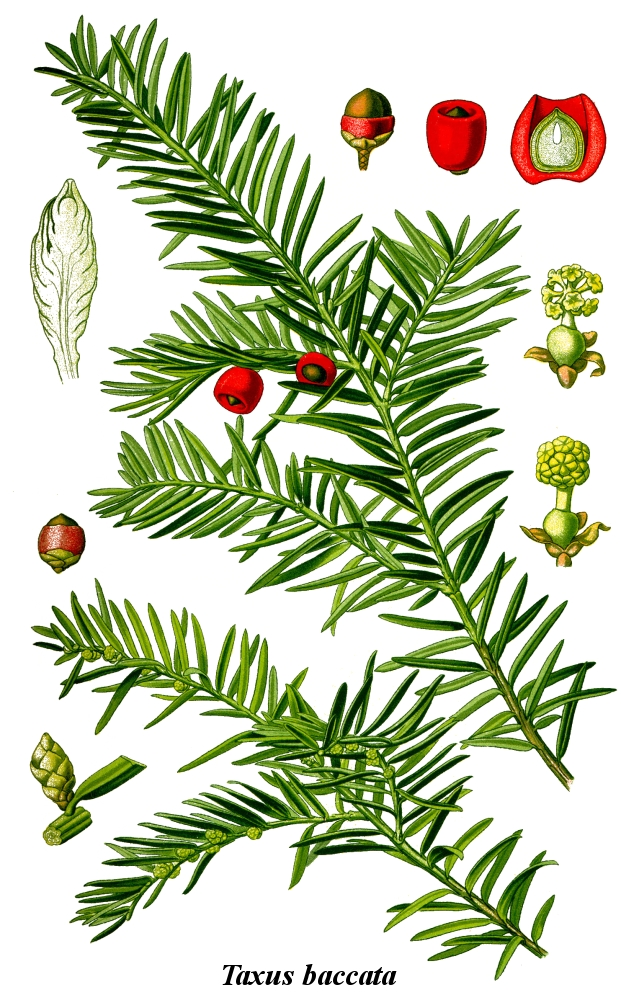
Botanical illustration
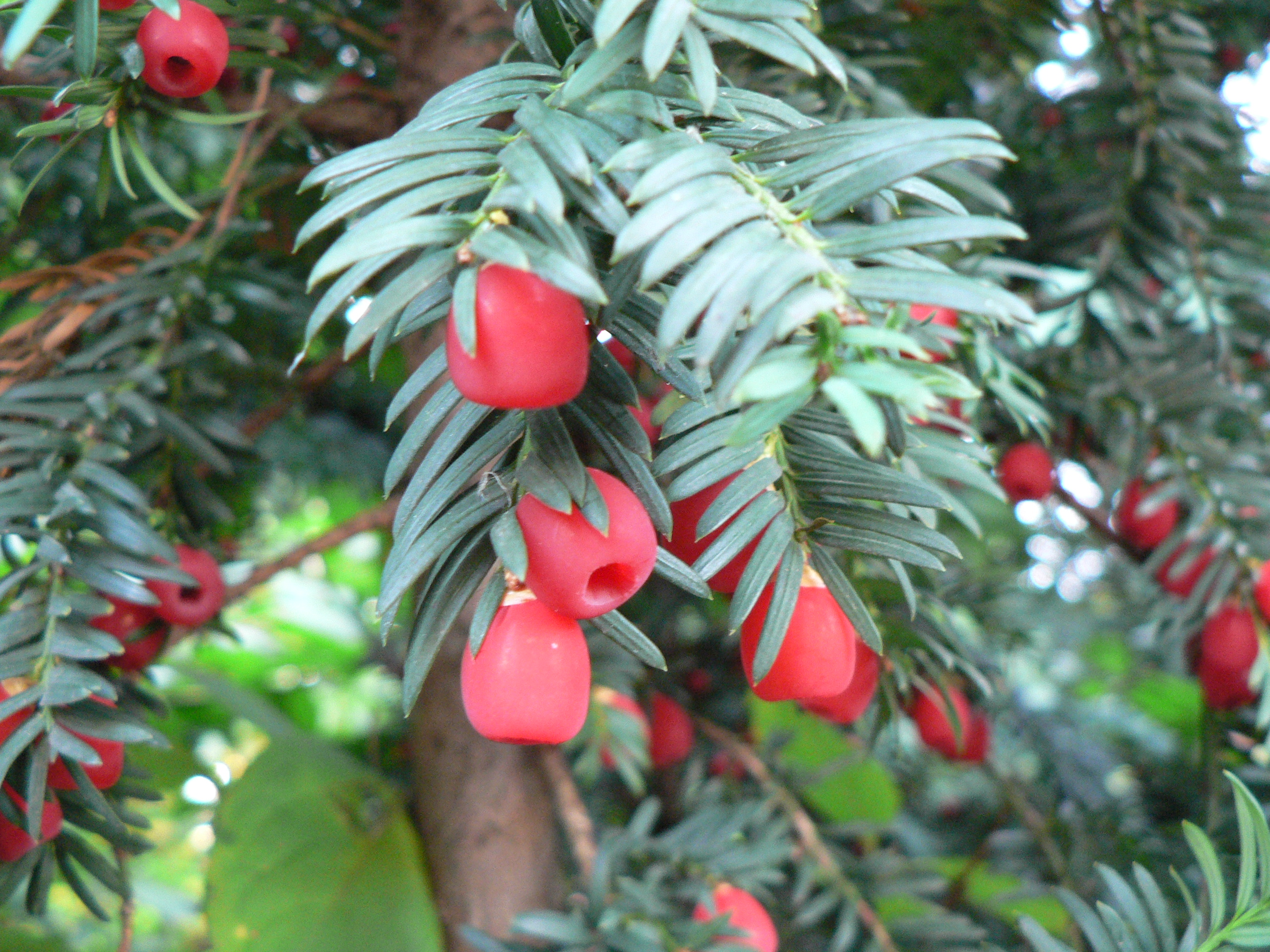
Foliage and female cones with red arils

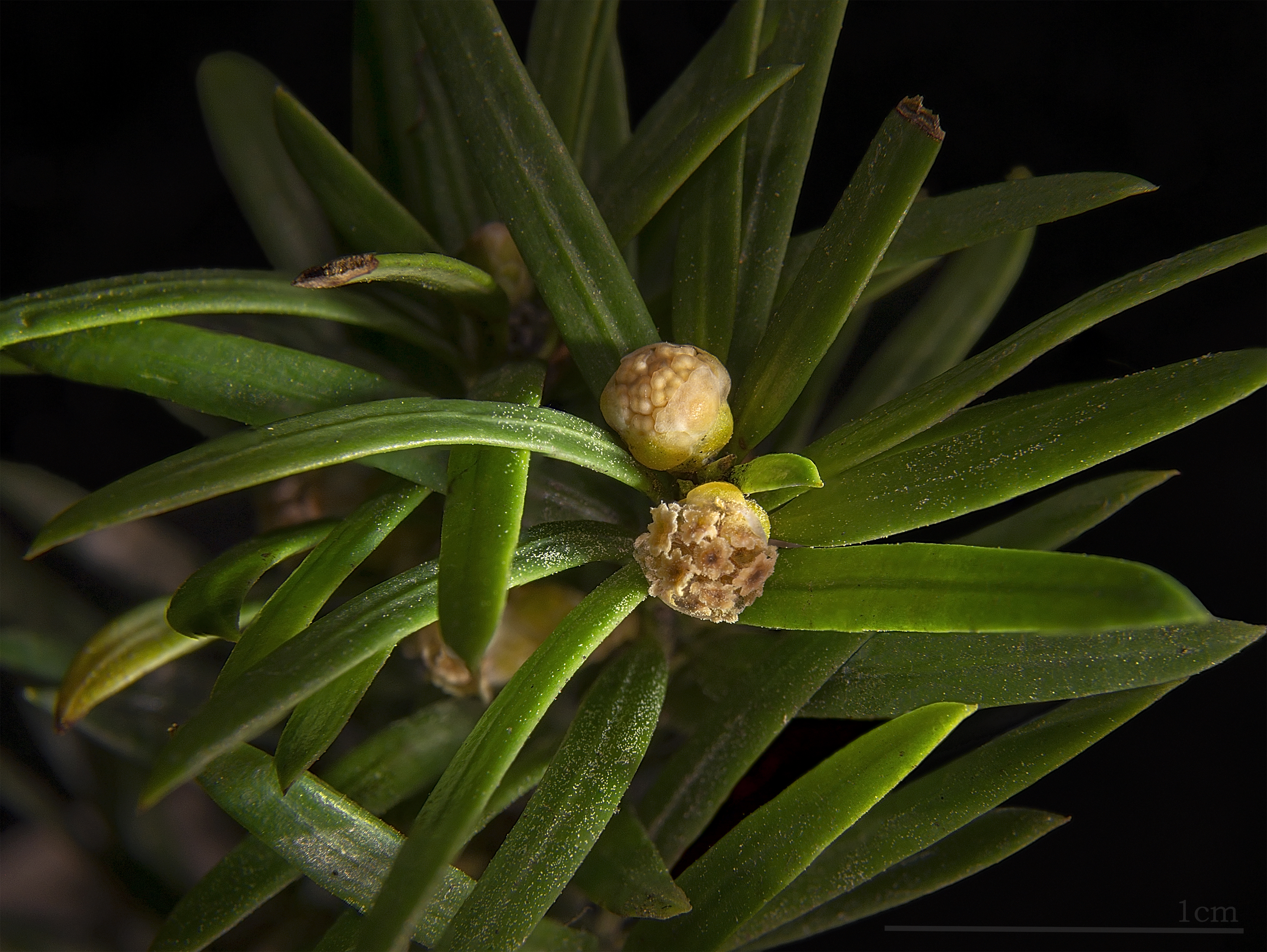
Male cones

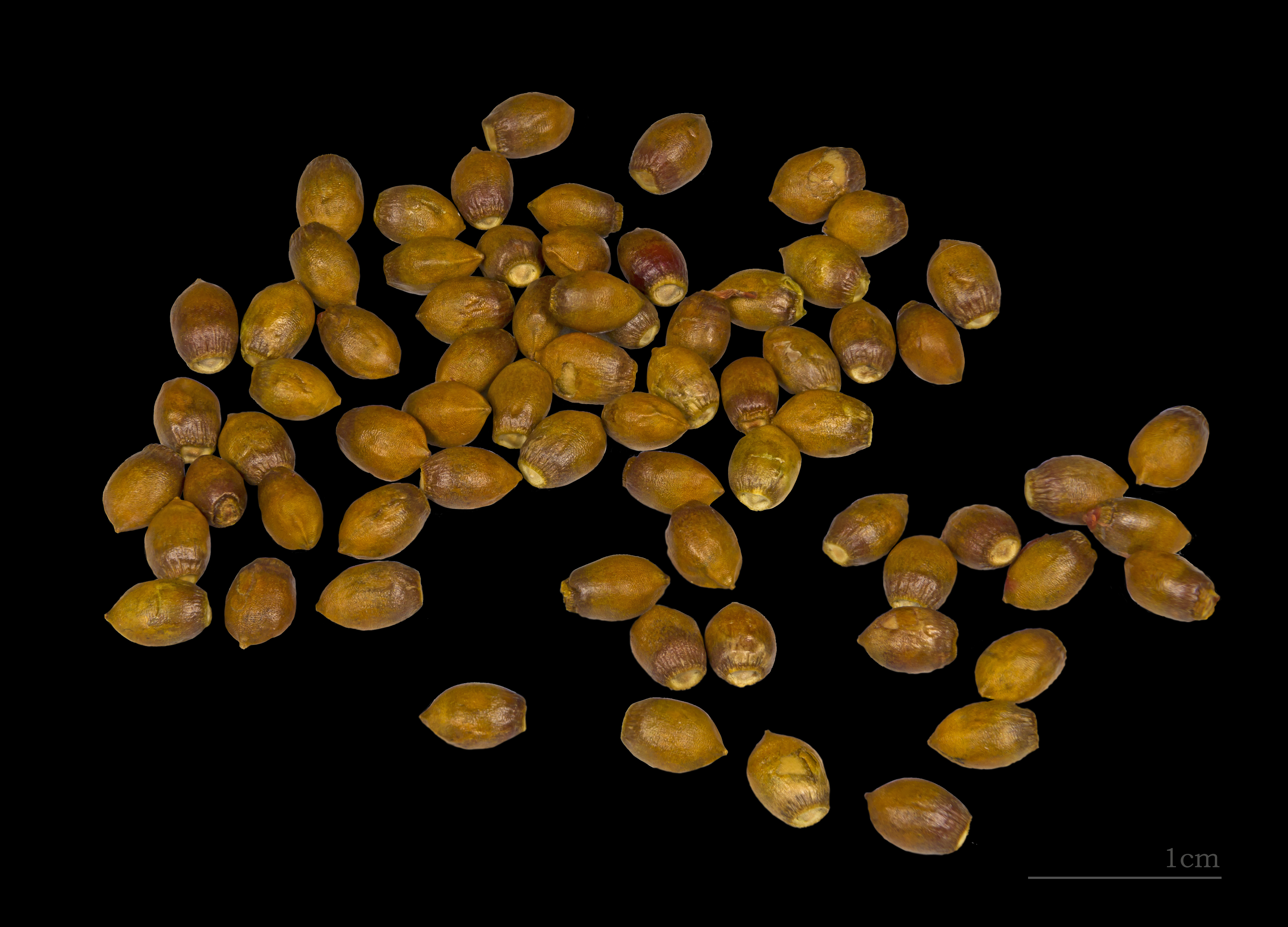
Seeds

== Distribution ==
The yew is native to all countries of Europe (except Iceland), the Caucasus, and beyond from Turkey eastwards to northern Iran. Its range extends south to Morocco and Algeria in North Africa, and parts of Southwest and South Asia. A few populations are present in the archipelagos of the Azores and Madeira. The limit of its northern Scandinavian distribution is its sensitivity to frost, with global warming predicted to allow its spread inland. It has been introduced elsewhere, including the United States.

== Habitat and ecology ==
The yew's richest central European populations are in Swiss yew-beech woodlands, on cool, steep marl slopes up to 1,400 metres (4,600 ft) in elevation in the Jura Mountains and Alpine foothills. In the UK it grows best on steep slopes of the chalk downs, forming extensive stands invading the grassland outside the beech woods. In more continental climates of Europe it fares better in mixed forests of both coniferous and mixed broadleaf-conifer composition. Under its evergreen shade, no other plants can grow.

The species prefers steep rocky calcareous slopes. It rarely develops beyond saplings on acid soil when under a forest canopy, but is tolerant of soil pH when planted by humans, such as their traditional placement in churchyards and cemeteries, where some of the largest and oldest trees in northwestern Europe are found. It grows well in well-drained soils, tolerating nearly any soil type, typically humus and base-rich soils, but also on rendzina and sand soils given adequate moisture. They can survive temporary flooding and moderate droughts. Roots can penetrate extremely compressed soils, such as on rocky terrain and vertical cliff faces. It normally appears individually or in small groups within the understory, but forms stands throughout its range, such as in sheltered calcareous sites. It is extremely shade-tolerant, with the widest temperature range for photosynthesis among European trees, able to photosynthesize in winter after deciduous trees have shed their leaves. It can grow under partial canopies of beech and other deciduous broad-leafed trees, though it only grows into large trees without such shade.

The arils are eaten by birds, which disperse the hard seeds undamaged in their droppings. Although they contain toxins, the kernels are extracted and eaten by some birds, such as hawfinches, greenfinches, and great tits.

== Conservation ==
Historically, yew populations were gravely threatened by felling for longbows and destruction to protect livestock from poisoning. It is now endangered in parts of its range due to intensive land use. The species is also harvested to meet pharmaceutical demand for taxanes. Trees are often damaged by browsing and bark stripping. Yew's thin bark makes it vulnerable to fire. Its toxicity protects against many insects, but the yew mite causes significant bud mortality, and seedlings can be killed by fungi.

Clippings from ancient specimens in the United Kingdom, including the Fortingall Yew, were taken to the Royal Botanic Gardens in Edinburgh to form a mile-long hedge. The purpose of this "Yew Conservation Hedge Project" is to maintain the DNA of Taxus baccata. A conservation programme was run in Catalonia in the early 2010s by the Forest Sciences Centre of Catalonia in order to protect genetically endemic yew populations and preserve them from overgrazing and forest fires. In the framework of this programme, the 4th International Yew Conference was organised in the Poblet Monastery in 2014. There has been a conservation programme in northern Portugal and Northern Spain (Cantabrian Range). In Europe, the species is conserved in a network of 74 genetic conservation units across eleven countries and in two ecozones.

== Harmfulness ==
=== Toxicity ===
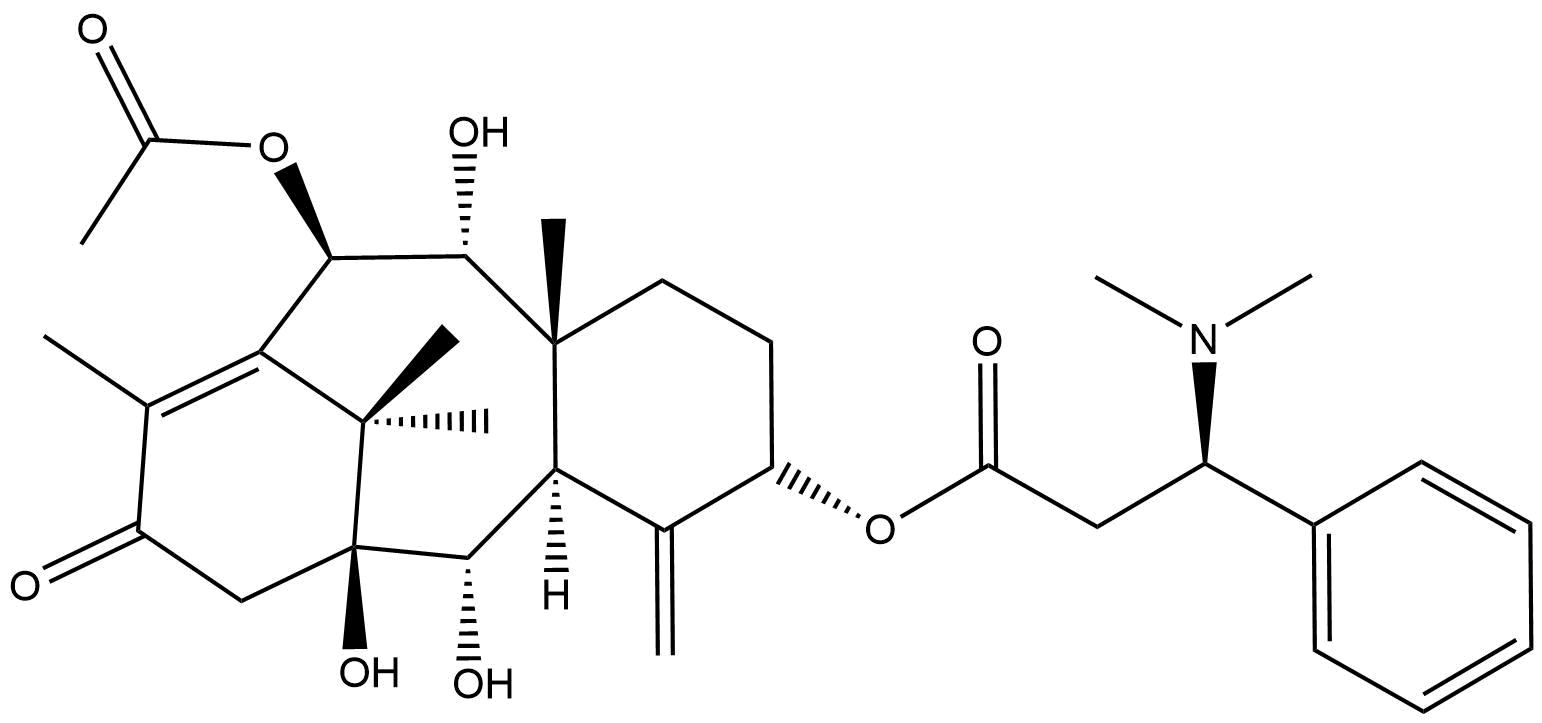
The structure of Taxine B, the cardiotoxic chemical in the yew plant

The entire plant is poisonous, with the exception of the aril (the red flesh of the "berry" covering the seed). Yews contain numerous toxic compounds, including alkaloids, ephedrine, nitriles, and essential oil. The most important toxins are taxine alkaloids; these are cardiotoxic compounds which act via calcium and sodium channel antagonism. If any leaves or seeds of the plant are ingested, urgent medical attention is recommended as well as observation for at least six hours after the point of ingestion.

Yew poisonings are relatively common in both domestic and wild animals which consume the plant accidentally, resulting in numerous livestock fatalities. Taxines are absorbed efficiently via the skin. Rabbits and deer have a level of immunity to the poisonous alkaloids.

According to Ondřej Piskač, "The lethal dose for an adult is reported to be 50 g of yew needles. Patients who ingest a lethal dose frequently die due to cardiogenic shock, in spite of resuscitation efforts." There are currently no known antidotes for yew poisoning, but drugs such as atropine have been used to treat the symptoms. Taxine remains in the plant all year, with maximal concentrations appearing during the winter. Dried yew plant material retains its toxicity for several months, and even increases its toxicity as the water is removed. Fallen leaves should therefore also be considered toxic. Poisoning usually occurs when leaves of yew trees are eaten, but in at least one case, a victim inhaled sawdust from a yew tree.

=== Allergenicity ===
Male yews are extremely allergenic, blooming and releasing abundant amounts of pollen in the spring, with an OPALS allergy scale rating of 10 out of 10. Completely female yews have an OPALS rating of 1, the lowest possible, trapping pollen while producing none. While yew pollen does not contain sufficient taxine alkaloids to cause poisoning, its allergenic potential has been implicated in adverse reactions to paclitaxel treatment.

== Uses ==
Yew wood was historically important, finding use in the Middle Ages in items such as musical instruments, furniture, and longbows. The species was felled nearly to extinction in much of Europe. In the modern day, it is not considered a commercial crop due to its very slow growth, but it is valued for hedging and topiary. Certain compounds in yew clippings are precursors of the chemotherapy drug taxol.

=== Woodworking ===
Wood from the yew is a closed-pore softwood, similar to cedar and pine. Easy to work, it is among the hardest of the softwoods, yet it possesses a remarkable elasticity, making it ideal for products that require springiness, such as bows. The wood is esteemed for cabinetry and tool handles. The hard, slow-growing wood also finds use in gates, furniture, parquet floors, and paneling. Its typical burls and contorted growth, with intricate multicolored patterns, make it attractive for carving and woodturning, but also make the wood unsuited for construction. It is good firewood and is sometimes burnt as incense. Due to all parts of the yew and its volatile oils being poisonous and cardiotoxic, a mask should be worn if one comes in contact with sawdust from the wood.

One of the world's oldest surviving wooden artifacts is a Clactonian yew spear head, found in 1911 at Clacton-on-Sea, in Essex, England. Known as the Clacton Spear, it is around 400,000 years old. Another spear made from yew is the Lehringen spear found in Germany, dating to around 120,000 years ago, thought to have been created by Neanderthals, and near the skeleton of a straight-tusked elephant which it was likely used to kill.

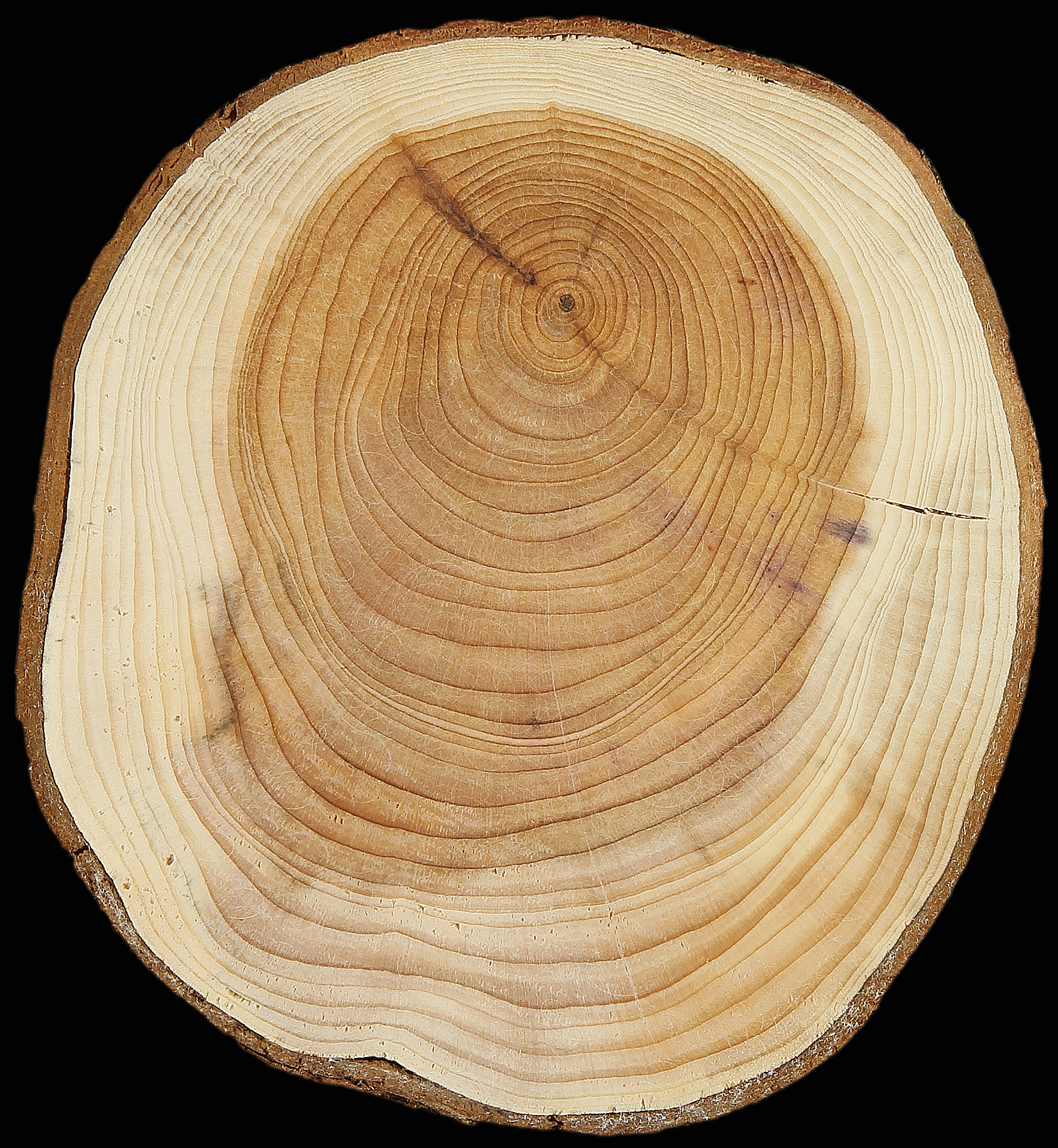
Section of wood
showing tree rings

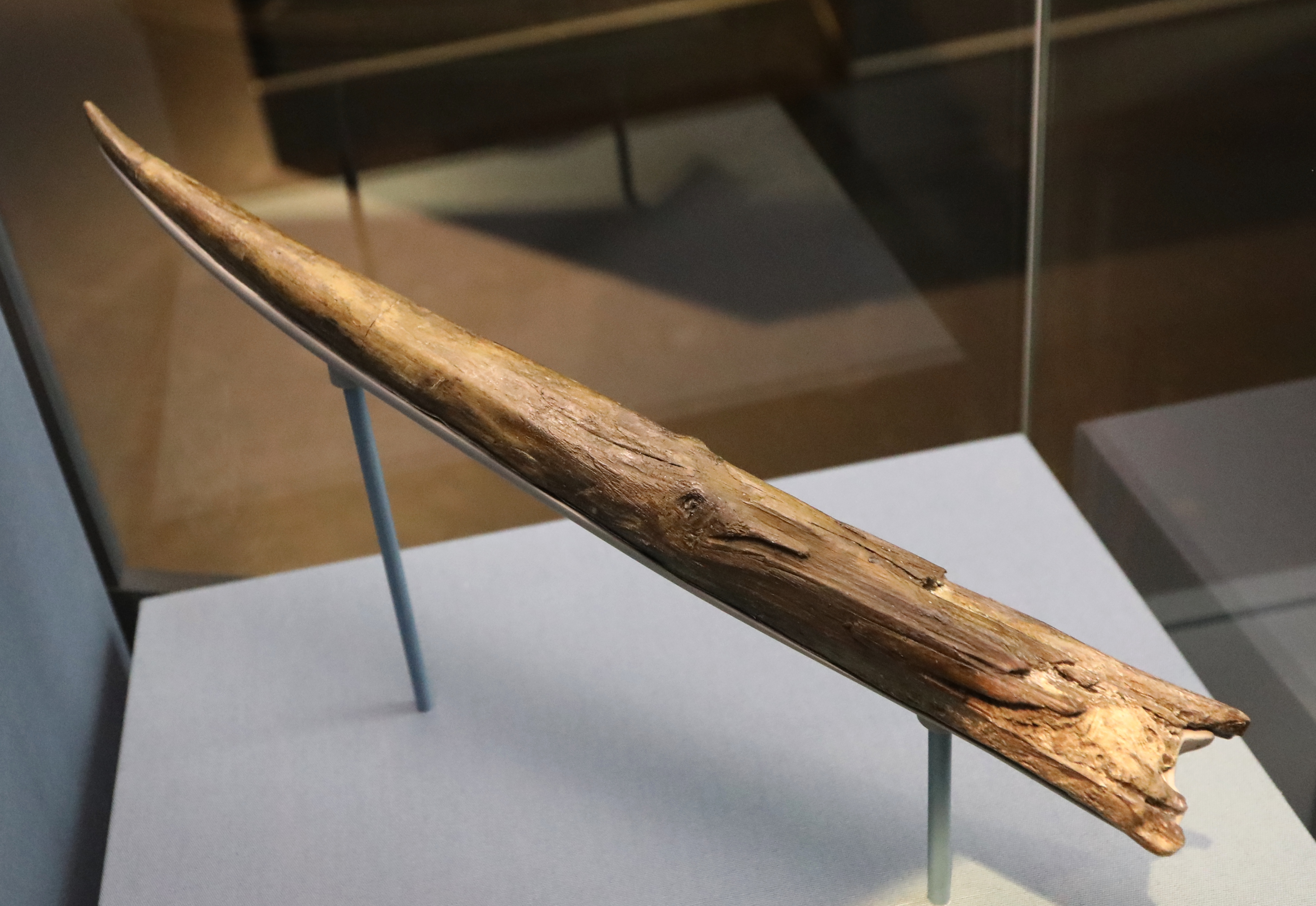
The Clacton Spear, the tip of a yew spear c. 400,000 years old

=== Longbows ===
The trade of yew wood to England for longbows was so robust that it depleted the stocks of good-quality, mature yew over a vast area. The first documented import of yew bowstaves to England was in 1294. In 1423, the Polish king commanded protection of yews in order to cut exports, facing nearly complete destruction of local yew stock. In 1470, compulsory archery practice was renewed, and hazel, ash, and laburnum were specifically allowed for practice bows. Supplies still proved insufficient until by the Statute of Westminster in 1472, every ship coming to an English port had to bring four bowstaves for every tun weight.

In 1507, the Holy Roman Emperor asked the Duke of Bavaria to stop cutting yew, but the trade was profitable, and in 1532, the royal monopoly was granted for the usual quantity "if there are that many". In 1562, the Bavarian government sent a long plea to the Holy Roman Emperor asking him to stop the cutting of yew, and outlining the damage done to the forests by its selective extraction, which broke the canopy and allowed wind to destroy neighbouring trees. In 1568, despite a request from Saxony, no royal monopoly was granted because there was no yew to cut, and the next year, Bavaria and Austria similarly failed to produce enough yew to justify a royal monopoly. Forestry records in this area in the 17th century do not mention yew, and it seems that no mature trees were to be had. The English tried to obtain supplies from the Baltic, but at this period, bows were being replaced by guns in any case.

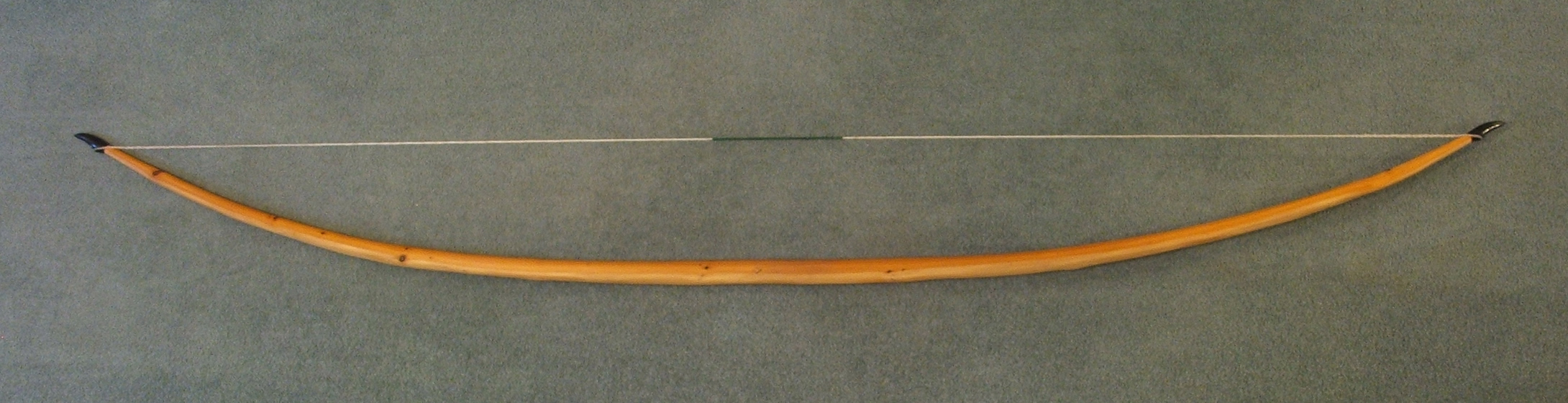
English longbow made of yew. It is 6 feet 6 inches (1.98 m) long with a draw force of 110 pounds-force (470 N).

=== Musical instruments ===
Yew has for centuries been used in musical instruments. Yew was a prized wood for lute construction from the 16th century, used by the Tieffenbrucker family of luthiers in Venice and then by other lute-makers.

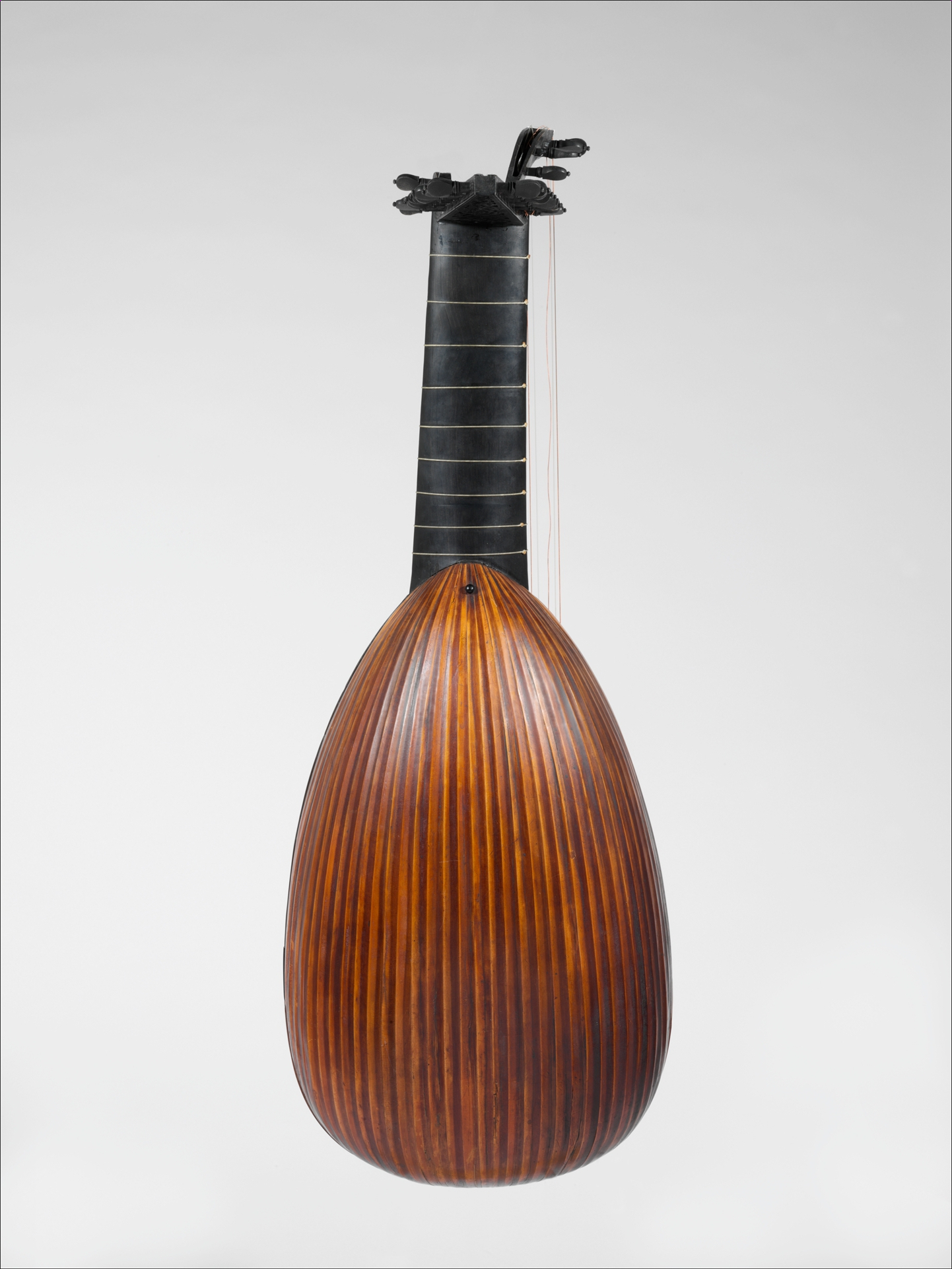
Tieffenbrucker lute made of yew, spruce, ebony, and maple. Italy, late 16th century

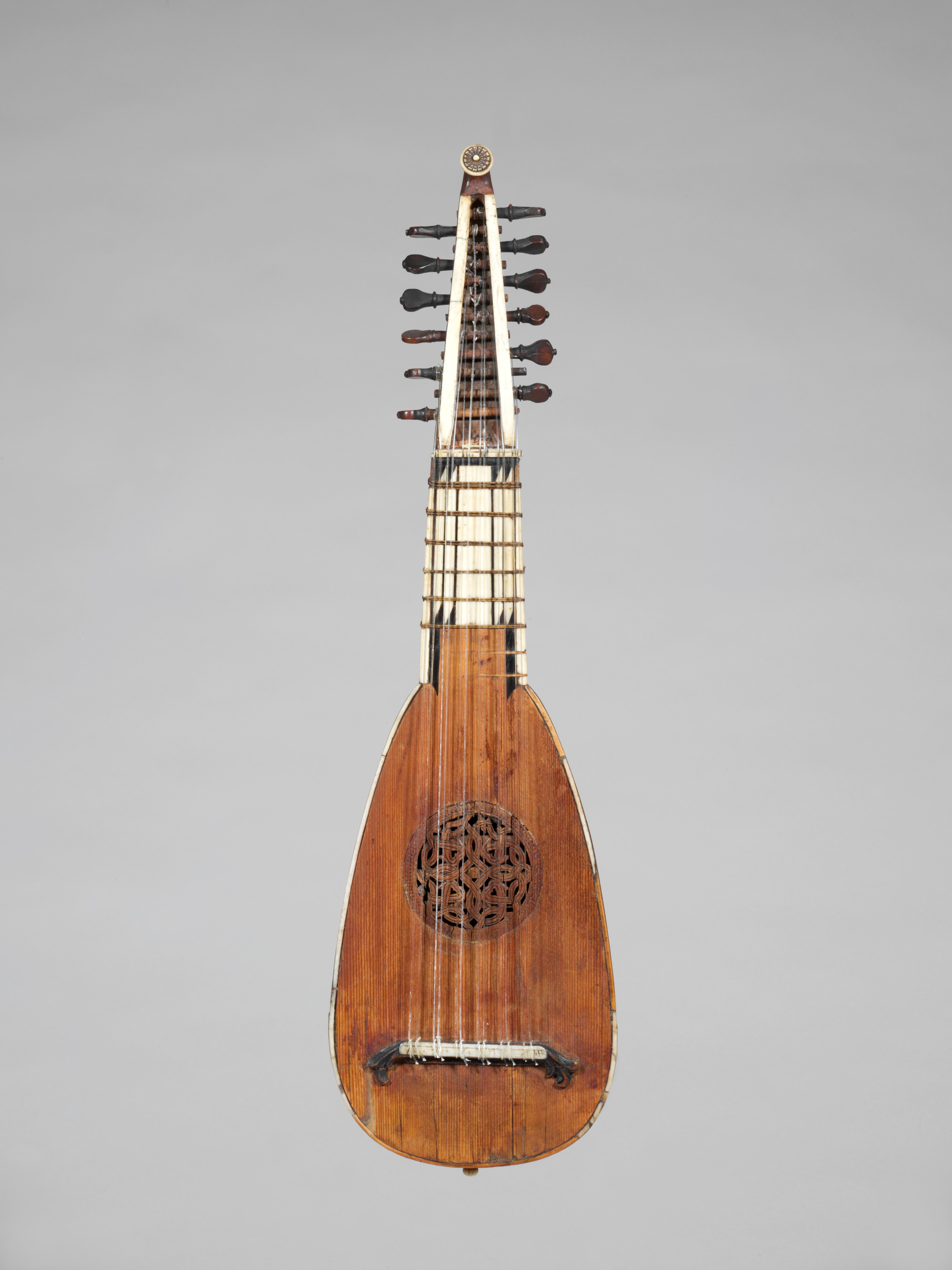
Italian mandolin made of yew, spruce, bone, and ebony. Italy, 1770

=== Horticulture ===
Yew is widely used in landscaping and ornamental horticulture. Due to its dense, dark green, mature foliage, and its tolerance of severe pruning, it is used especially for formal hedges and topiary. Its relatively slow growth rate means that in such situations it needs to be clipped only once per year (in late summer). It tolerates a wide range of soils and situations, including shallow chalk soils and shade. The species is tolerant of urban pollution, cold, and heat, though soil compaction can harm it. It is slow-growing, taking about 20 years to grow 4.5 metres (15 ft) tall, and vertical growth effectively stops after 100 years.

In Europe, the species grows naturally north to Molde in southern Norway, but is used in gardens further north. It is popular as a bonsai in many parts of Europe.

Well over 200 yew cultivars have been named. The most popular of these are the Irish yew (T. baccata var 'Fastigiata'), selected from two trees found growing in Ireland, and the several cultivars with yellow leaves, collectively known as "golden yew".

The following cultivars have gained the Royal Horticultural Society's Award of Garden Merit:

- T. baccata 'Fastigiata' (Irish yew)
- T. baccata 'Fastigiata Aureomarginata' (golden Irish yew)
- T. baccata 'Icicle'
- T. baccata 'Repandens'
- T. baccata 'Repens Aurea'
- T. baccata 'Semperaurea'
- T. baccata 'Standishii'
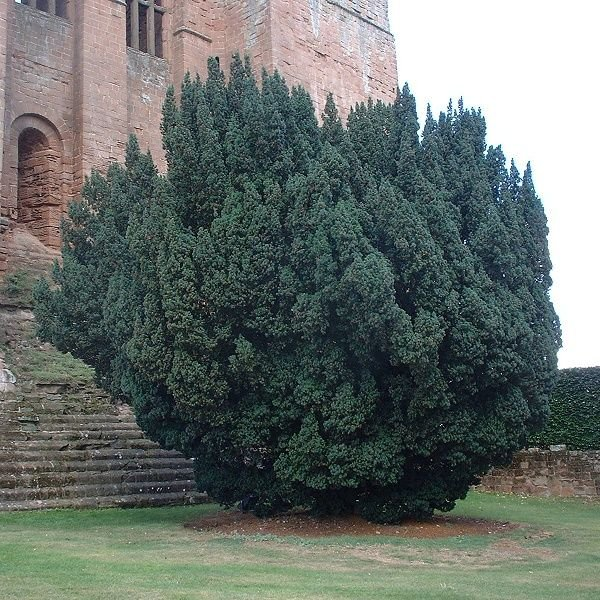
An Irish yew, var. 'Fastigiata', at Kenilworth Castle

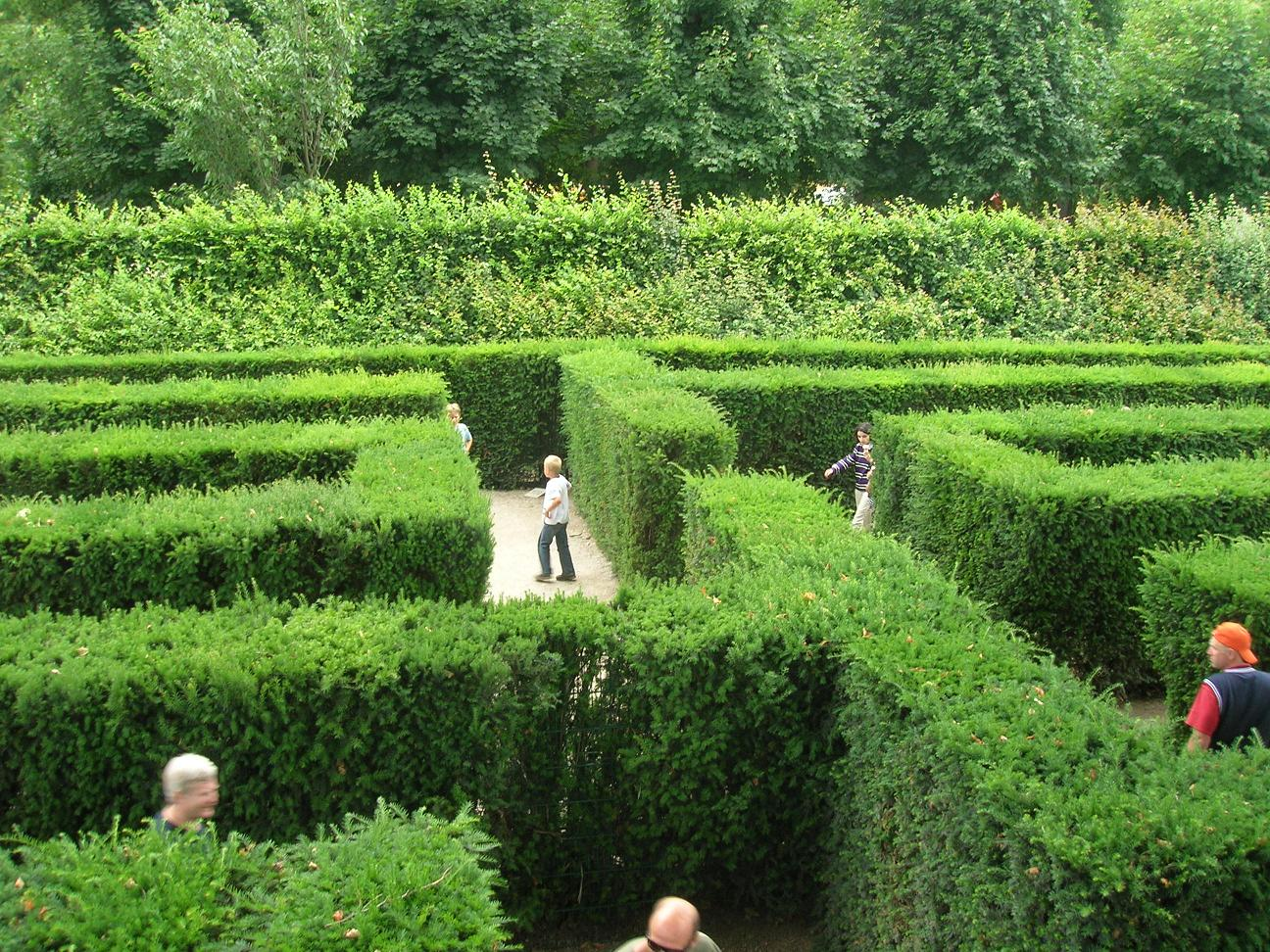
Yew hedges for the Schönbrunn maze

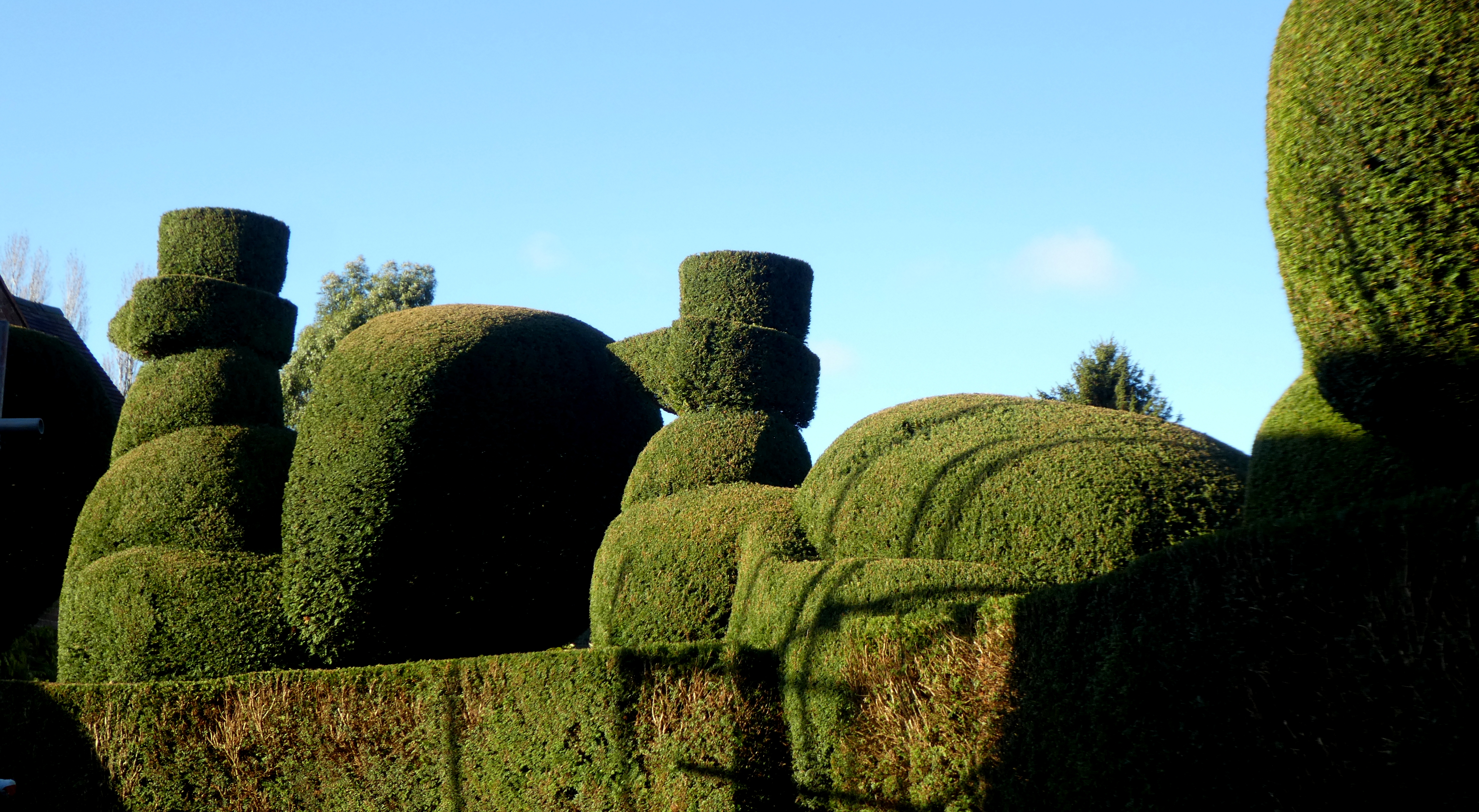
The slow growth and tolerance of pruning make yew popular for topiary.

=== Culinary ===
The edible arils, often called "yew berries" (or traditionally as "snotty gogs" in parts of England), are eaten by some foragers in western countries, though the seed inside the aril is toxic.

== Traditions ==
=== Longevity ===
The yew can reach at least 600 years of age, but ages are often overestimated. Ten yews in Britain are believed to predate the 10th century. The potential age of yews is impossible to determine accurately and is subject to much dispute. There is rarely any wood as old as the entire tree, while the boughs themselves often become hollow with age, making ring counts impossible. Growth rates and archaeological work of surrounding structures suggest the oldest yews, such as the Fortingall Yew in Perthshire, Scotland, may be 2,000 years old or more, placing them among the oldest plants in Europe. The Fortingall Yew has one of the largest recorded trunk girths in Britain, reportedly 16–17 m (52–56 ft) in the 18th century. The Llangernyw Yew in Clwyd, Wales, at another early saint site, is some 4,000–5,000 years old according to an investigation led by the botanist David Bellamy, who carbon-dated a yew in Tisbury, Wiltshire at around 4,000 years old.

The Ankerwycke Yew is an ancient yew tree close to the ruins of St Mary's Priory, the site of a Benedictine nunnery built in the 12th century, near Wraysbury in Berkshire, England. It is a male tree with a girth of 8 metres (26 ft) at 0.3 metres. The tree is at least 1,400 years old, and could be as old as 2,500 years.

The Balderschwang Yew, estimated to be 600 to 1,000 years old, may be the oldest tree in Germany. According to local legend, the Caesarsboom, Caesar's Tree in Lo, Belgium, is over 2,000 years old, though current estimates based on its size rather put it at 250. The Florence Court Yew in County Fermanagh, Northern Ireland, is the oldest tree of the Irish Yew cultivar (Taxus baccata 'Fastigiata'). The cultivar has become ubiquitous in cemeteries across the world, and it is believed that all known examples are from cuttings from this tree.

The Bermiego Yew in Asturias, Spain stands 15 m (49 ft) tall with a trunk diameter of 6.82 m (22 ft 4 1/2 in) and a crown diameter of 15 m (49 ft). It was declared a Natural Monument in 1995 by the Asturian government and is protected by the Plan of Natural Resources.

The Borrowdale Yews were described by William Wordsworth in his 1815 poem "Yew Trees", including the lines:

Of vast circumference and gloom profound
This solitary Tree! – a living thing
Produced too slowly ever to decay;
Of form and aspect too magnificent
To be destroyed. But worthier still of note
Are those fraternal Four of Borrowdale,
Joined in one solemn and capacious grove;

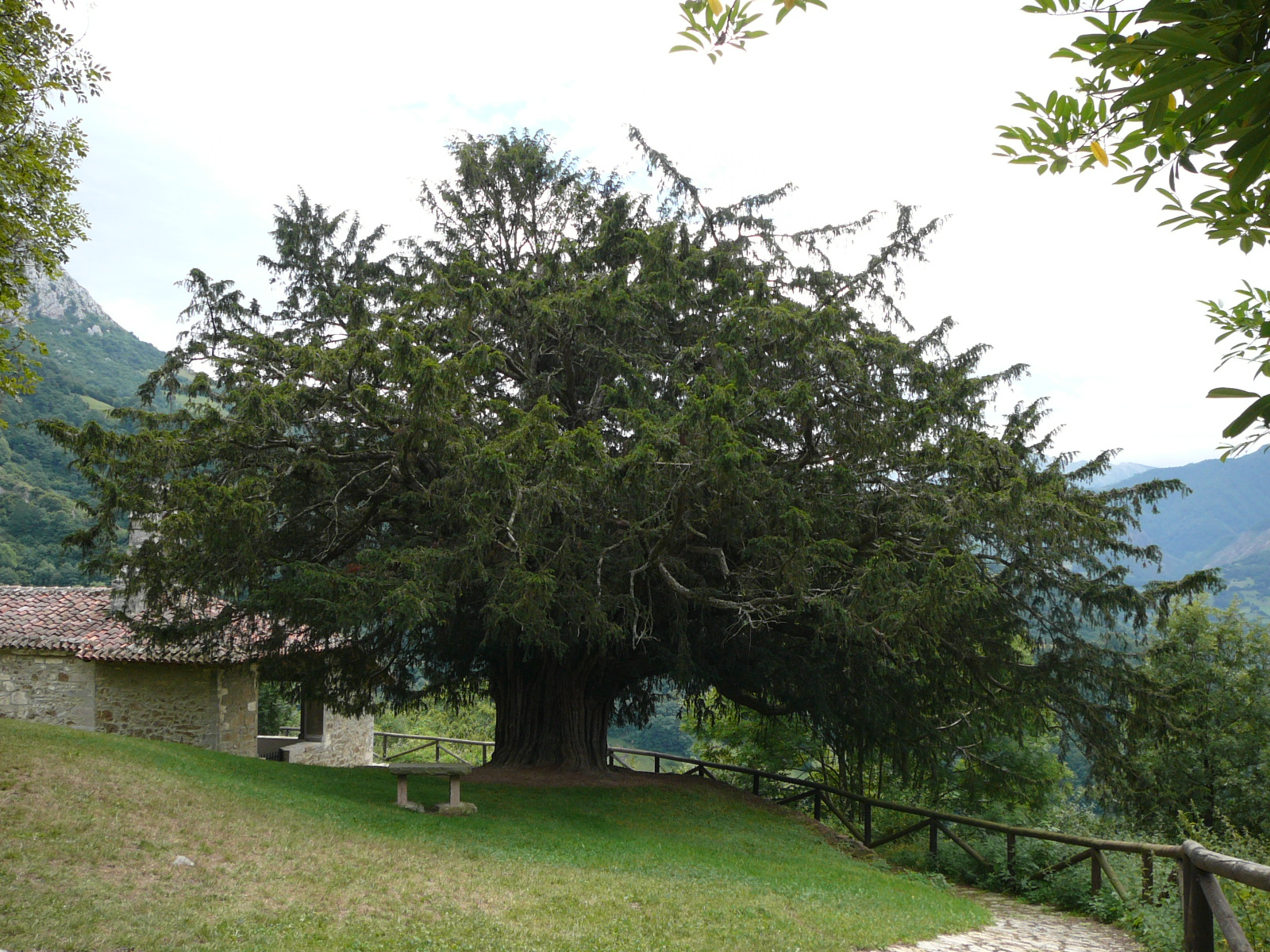
The Bermiego Yew,
Asturias, Spain

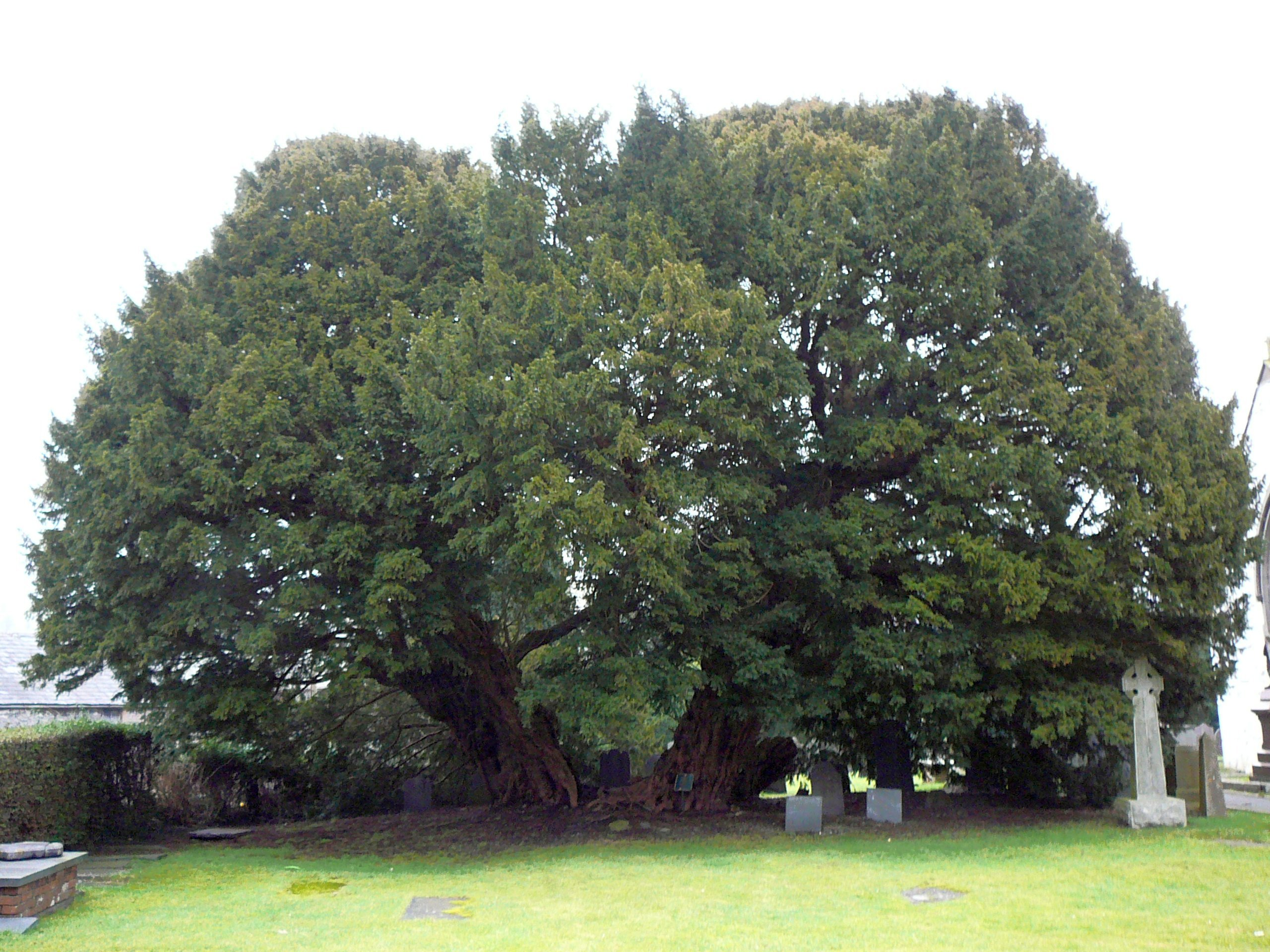
The Llangernyw Yew, Conwy, Wales

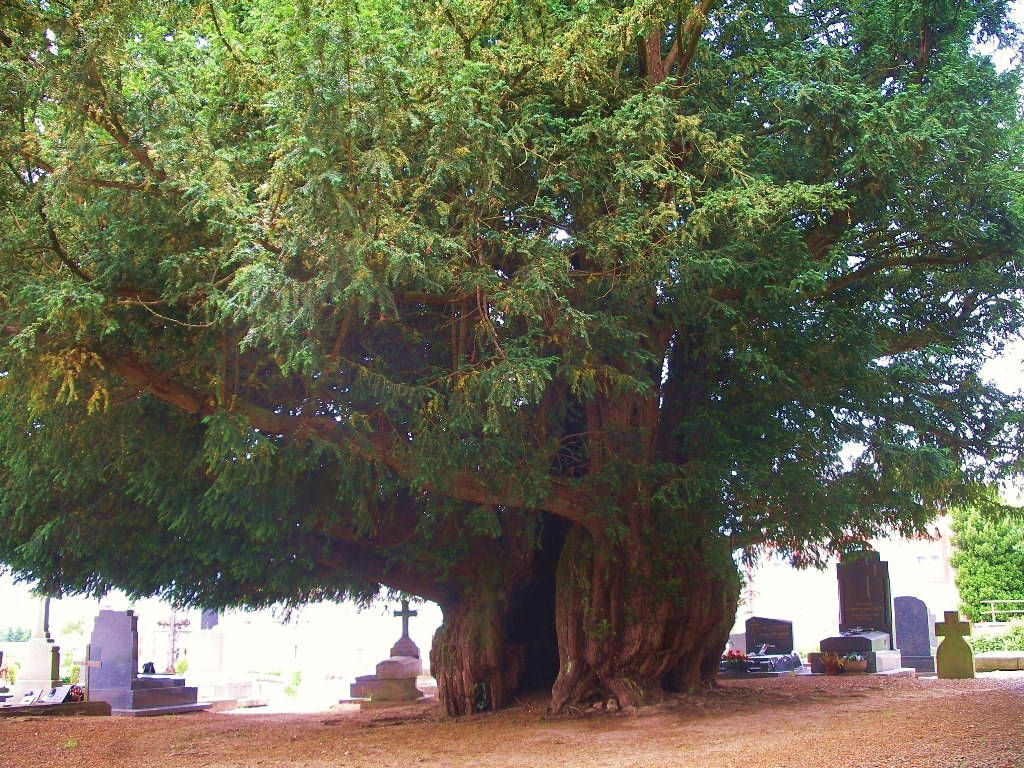
The Estry Yew, Normandy, France

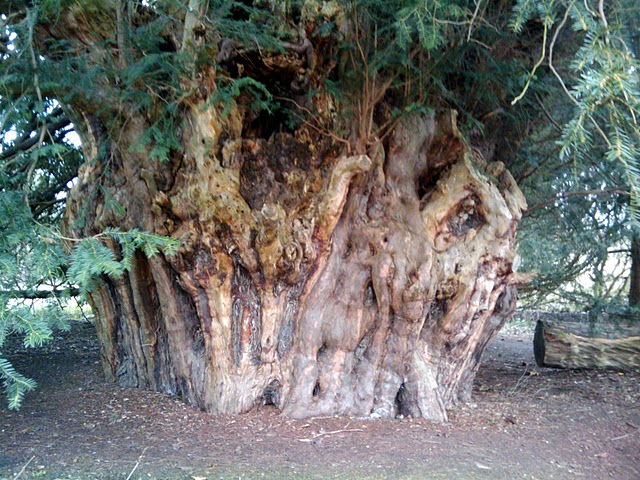
The Ankerwycke Yew, Berkshire, England

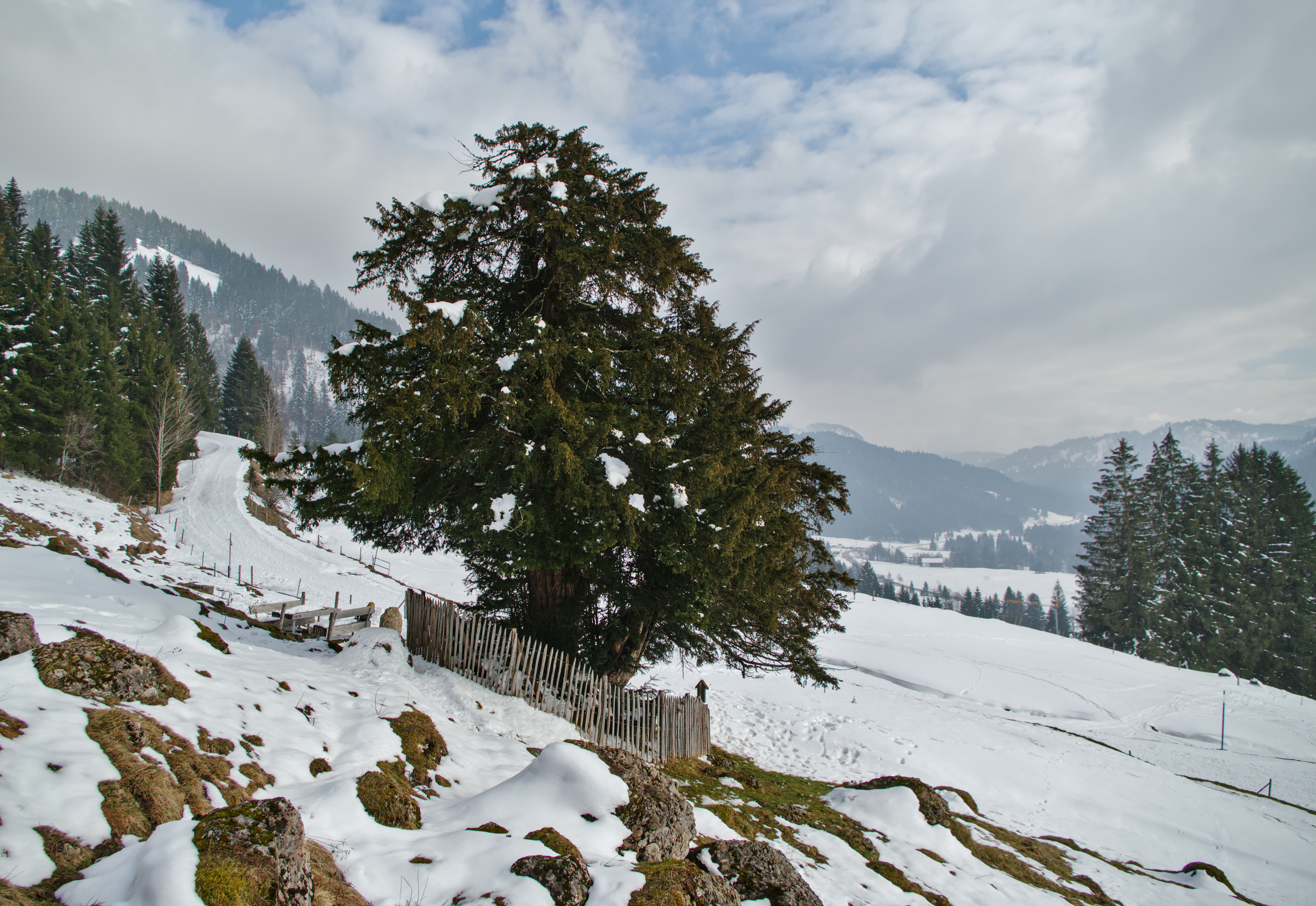
The Balderschwang Yew, Bavaria, Germany

=== Religion ===
==== Celtic ====
Several scholars have taken the Celtic word *eburos to mean "yew". There is according to the scholar of English Ralph Elliott, "strong evidence" that the yew was important to the ancient Celtic peoples of Western Europe, perhaps having come to symbolise immortality through being evergreen. On the Iberian Peninsula, a deity Eburianus is named on a tombstone in Segovia, with related placenames like Ebura, and the Gallic peoples Eburanci, Eburones, and Eburovices. Julius Caesar recorded that the Eburones' chieftain Catuvolcus killed himself by consuming yew. The Roman historians Lucius Annaeus Florus and Orosius record that in the Cantabrian Wars, the besieged people at Mons Medullius killed themselves the same way. The structures translated as "booths" or "temples", Latin fana, mentioned by Roman historians such as Pliny the Elder, may have been hollow trees or structures of yew branches.

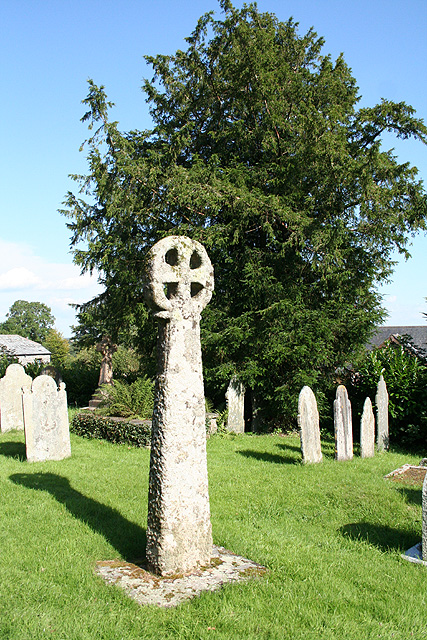
Scholars have proposed that the yew was important to Celtic peoples. Celtic cross and yew tree, Laneast, Cornwall.

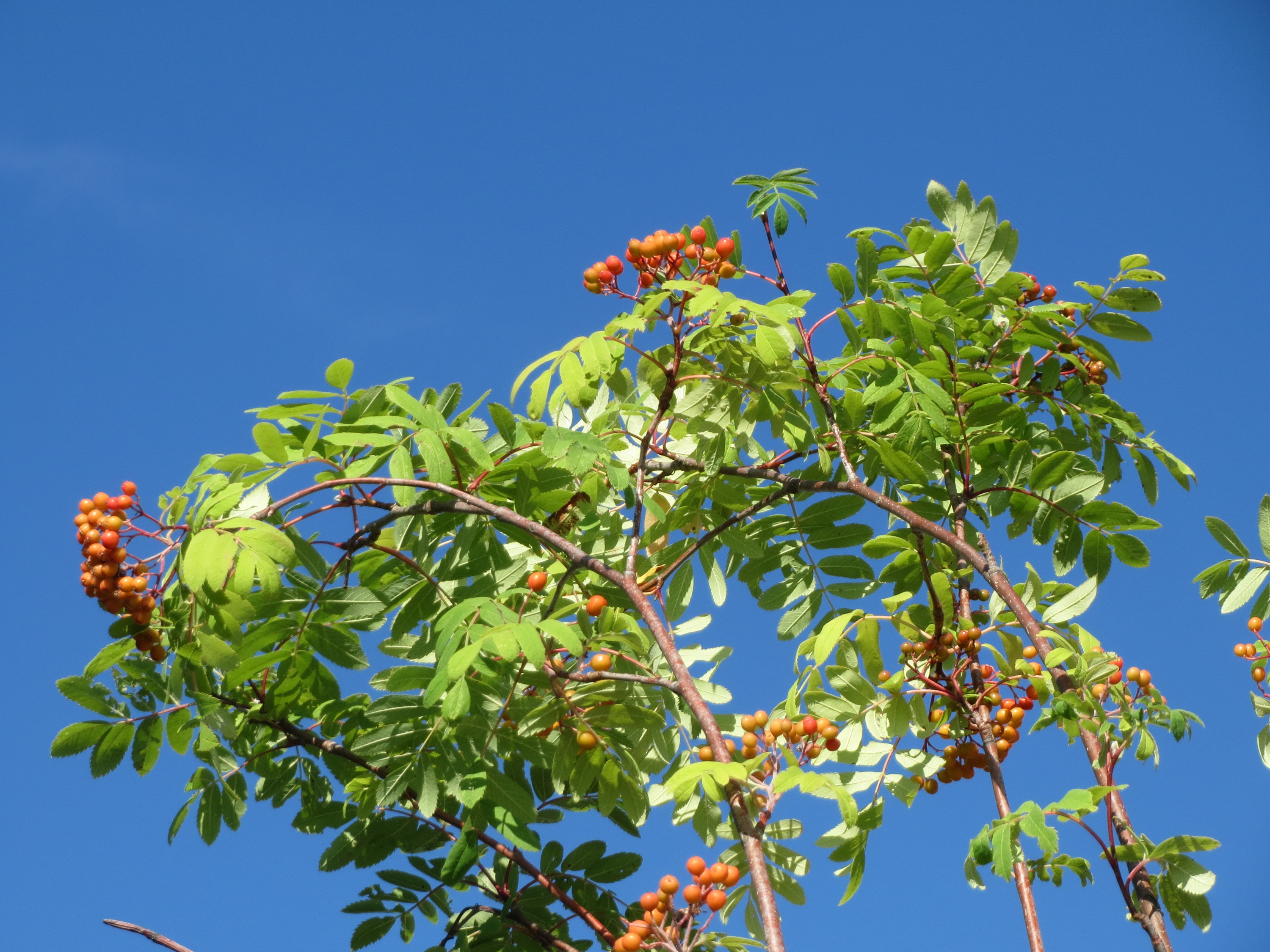
The Proto-Celtic word *eburos may have meant the rowan, not the yew.

Other linguists, such as Andrew Breeze and Peter Schrijver, dispute the etymological connection of *eburos and "yew". Breeze doubts that the Roman name of the city of York, Eburacum, meant "place where yews grow". Schrijver states that while *eburos was certainly the name of a plant, the only good evidence for its meaning "yew" is the Old Irish ibar, Scottish Gaelic iubhar. In other Celtic languages, it means other plants: Breton evor "alder buckthorn", and Welsh efwr "hogweed"; in Continental Celtic, it may have meant the rowan tree, as evidenced indirectly by German Eber-esche. Schrijver agrees that names of people, places, and a god make use of *eburos, but writes that the poisonings, as of Catuvolcus, do not prove a connection of the word with the yew, as the plant's toxicity was widely known, not limited to one tribe. He suggests that the Proto-Celtic *eburos probably meant the rowan, remaining as such on the continent, but becoming attached later to other plants in Ireland and Wales. The Welsh yw and Old Irish éo imply Proto-Celtic *iwo for "yew"; Schrijver suggests this was the one and only Proto-Celtic name for the tree.

Diagram of Peter Schrijver's reconstruction of the etymology
of the Celtic words for "yew"

==== Nordic ====
The tree Yggdrasil of Norse cosmology has traditionally been interpreted as a giant ash tree. Some scholars now believe that the tree is most likely a yew. Frits Läffler suggested that the sacred tree at the Temple at Uppsala was a yew.

==== Churchyards ====
The yew is traditionally and regularly found in churchyards in England, Wales, Scotland, Ireland, and Normandy in Northern France. Some examples can be found in La Haye-de-Routot or La Lande-Patry. It is said up to 40 people could stand inside one of the La-Haye-de-Routot yew trees, and the Le Ménil-Ciboult yew is probably the largest, with a girth of 13 m (43 ft).

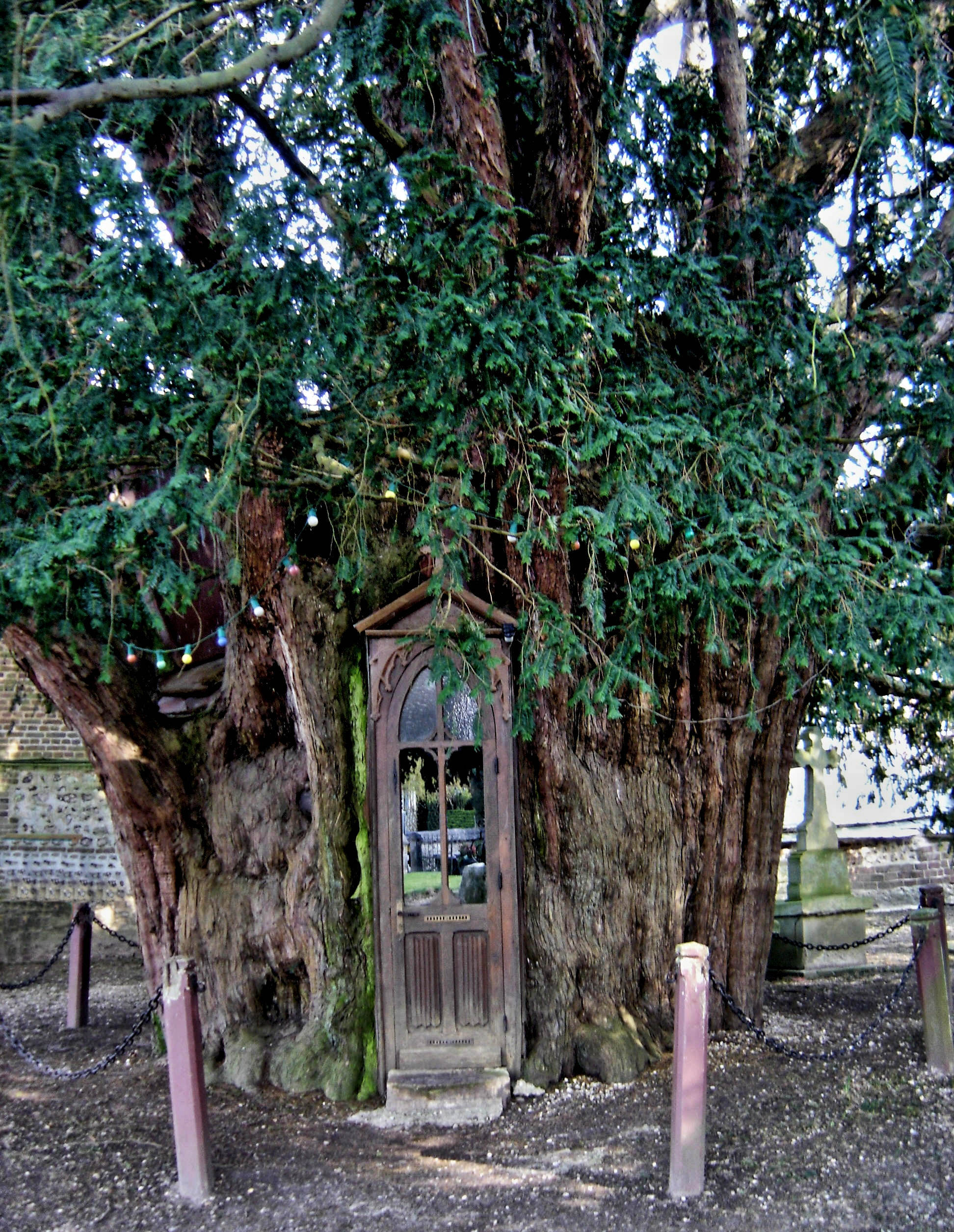
Norman chapel in a yew tree, Church of Notre-Dame,
La Haye-de-Routot, France

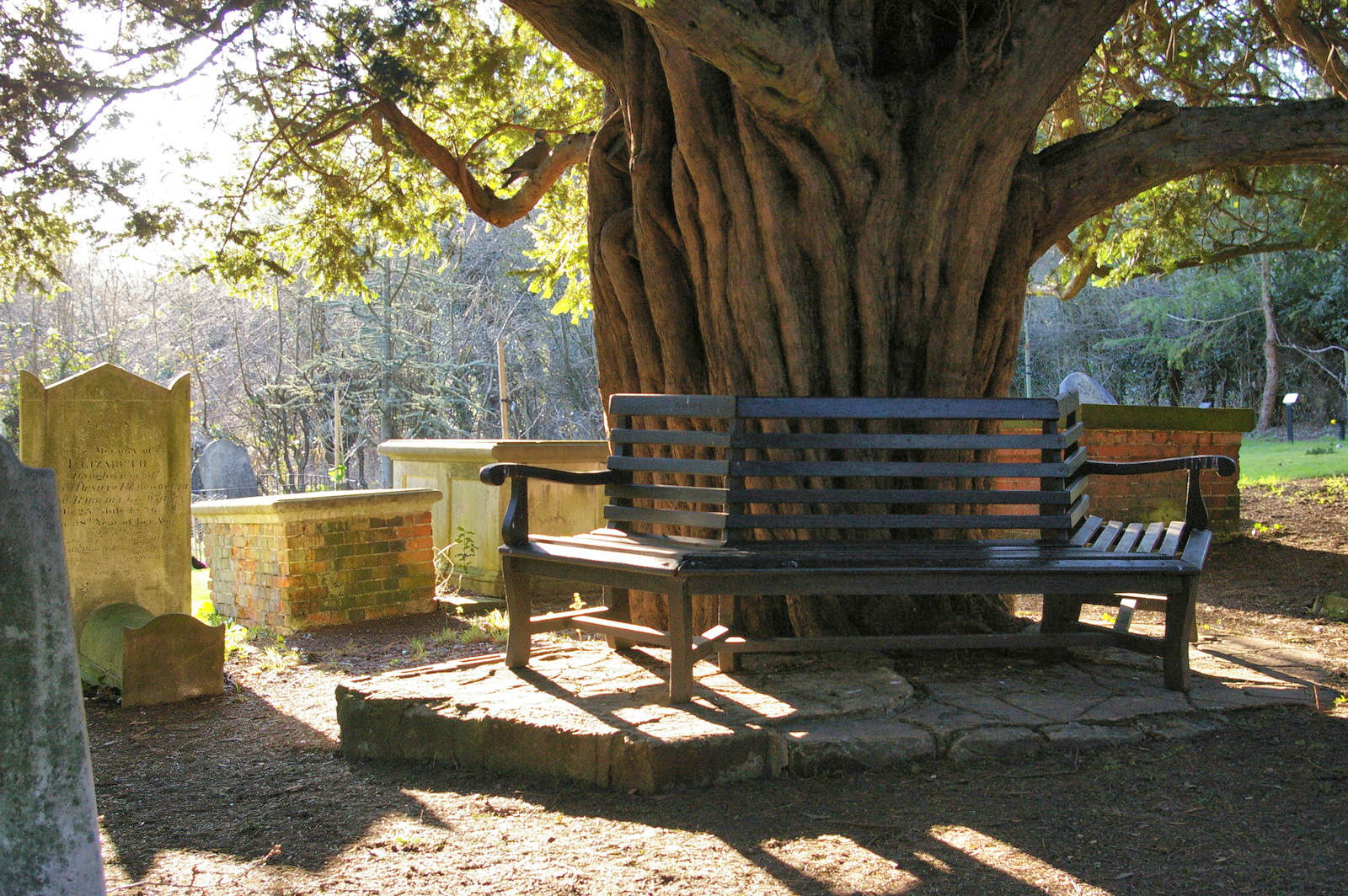
Yew tree and bench,
St Giles the Abbot,
Farnborough, Hampshire

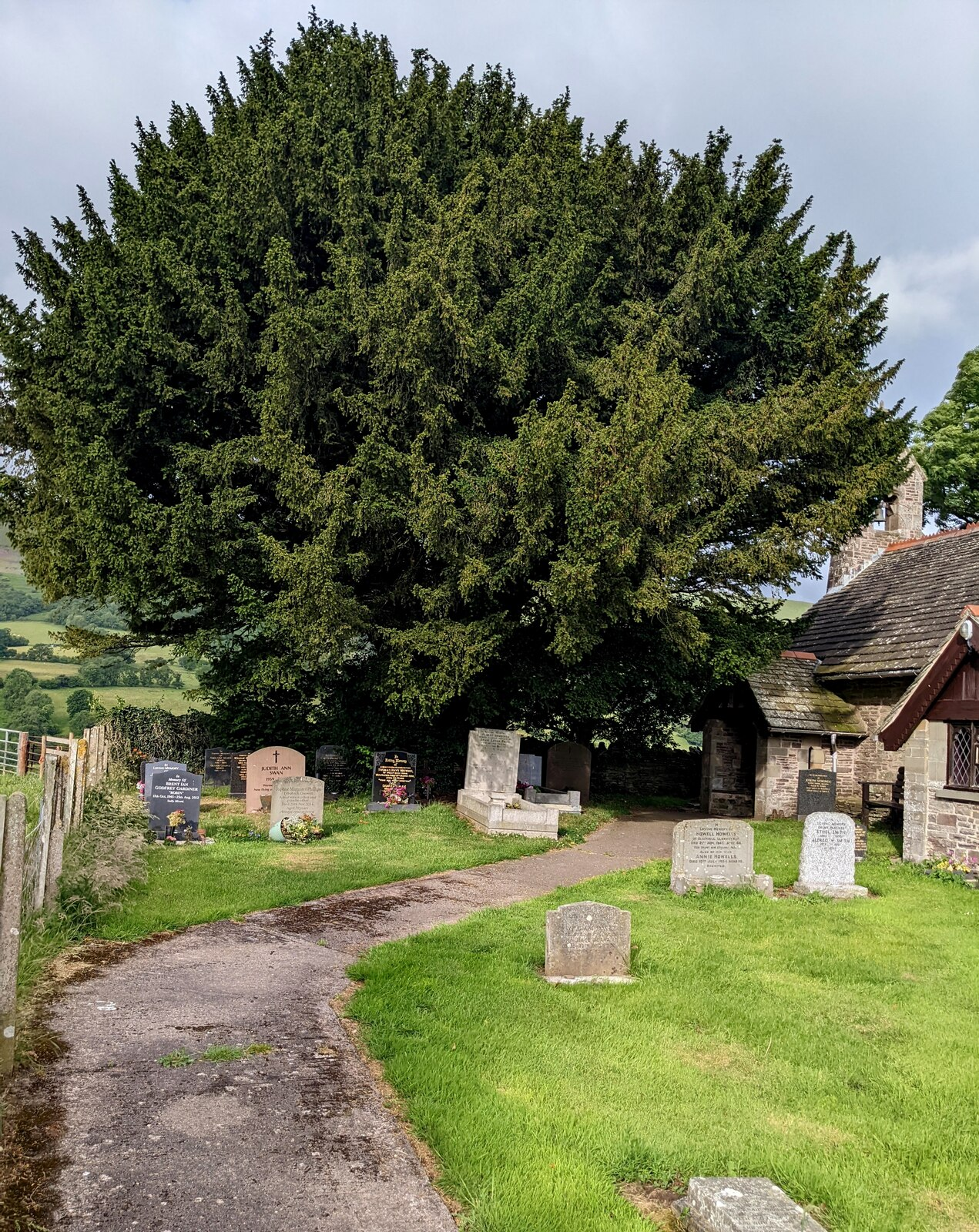
Churchyard yew,
Llanveynoe, Herefordshire

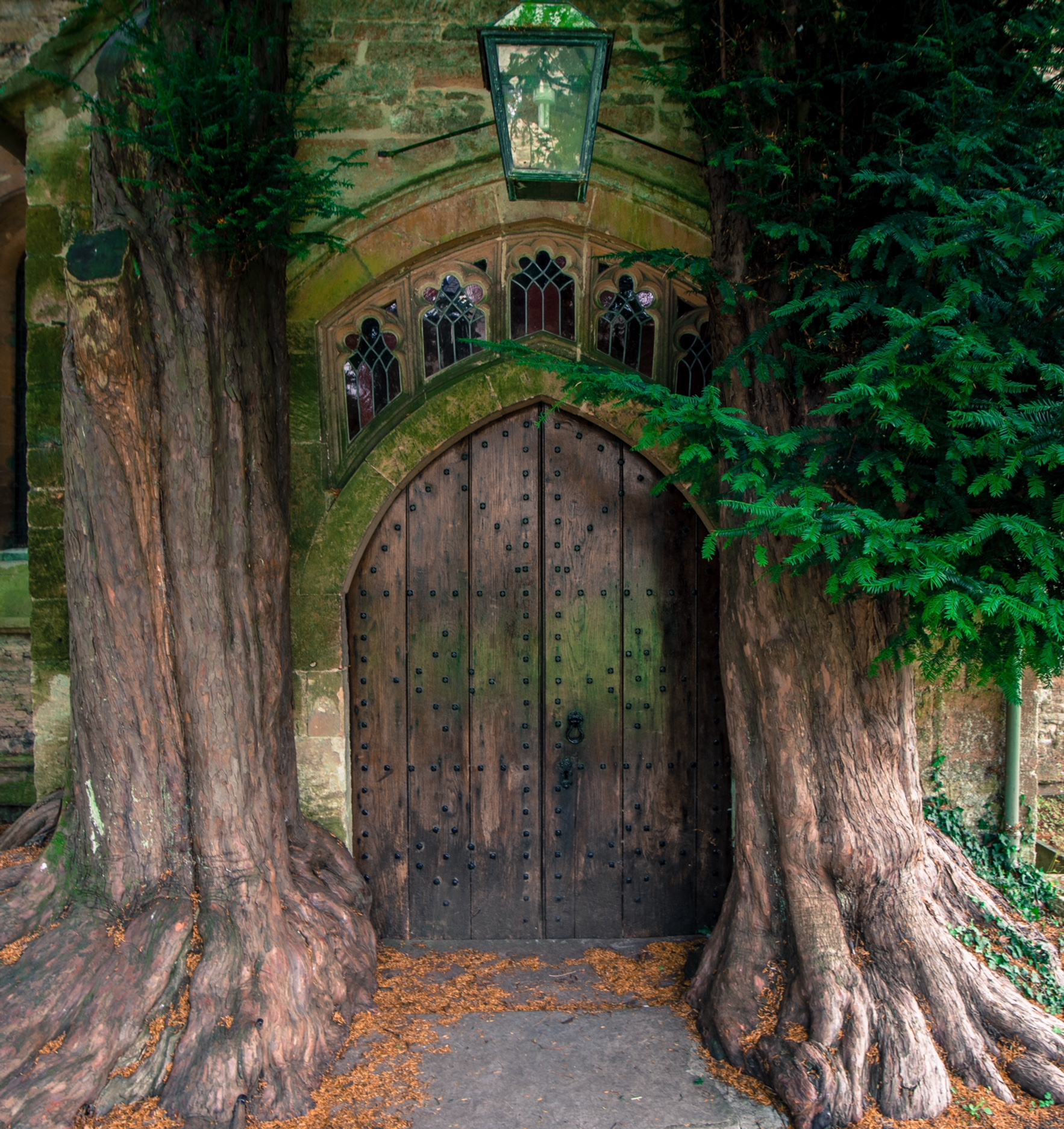
Yews framing the door of
St Edward's Church,
Stow-on-the-Wold

Multiple explanations for the association with churchyards have been proposed. Some Anglo-Saxon churches may have been built intentionally on "places of assembly, not improbably sites of earlier pagan fanes where ritual and yew magic went hand in hand". Another theory is that yews were planted at religious sites as their long life was suggestive of eternity, or because, being toxic when ingested, they were seen as trees of death. Some yews existed before their churches, as preachers held services beneath them when churches were unavailable. The ability of their branches to root and sprout anew after touching the ground may have caused yews to become symbols of death, rebirth, and therefore immortality. King Edward I of England ordered yew trees to be planted in churchyards to protect the buildings. The tradition of planting yew trees in churchyards throughout Britain and Ireland may have started as a resource for longbows, such as at "Ardchattan Priory, whose yew trees, according to other accounts, were inspected by Robert the Bruce and cut to make at least some of the longbows used at the Battle of Bannockburn". Another explanation is that yews were planted to discourage farmers and drovers from letting animals wander onto the burial grounds, the poisonous foliage being the disincentive. A further possible reason is that fronds and branches of yew were often used as a substitute for palms on Palm Sunday.

Proposed explanations for yews in churchyards
Reason	Explanations
Symbolised death, rebirth, eternity, immortality	Toxic; long-lived; ability to sprout anew; evergreen, with "somber appearance"
Supernatural protection for church buildings	Association with death/rebirth, as above
Anglo-Saxon churches built on pagan sites	Decision to adapt remnants of paganism to Christianity
To discourage grazing in churchyards	Toxic
To supply fronds for Palm Sunday	Easier than getting palm fronds; association with death/rebirth, as above, fitting for Palm Sunday
To supply wood for longbows	Use as weapons, keeping the toxic trees away from grazing animals

=== Place names ===
Words thought to mean 'yew tree' appear in some place names. Ydre in the South Swedish highlands means "place of yews". Proto-Celtic *eburos is the source of several placenames, but its association with the yew is disputed. If correct, it led to multiple forms: Old Irish ibar; Irish iobhar, iubhar, and iúr (as in Terenure (Irish: Tír an Iúir, meaning 'land of the yew tree')), as well as Scottish Gaelic iubhar. Thus, Newry, Northern Ireland is an anglicization of An Iúraigh, an oblique form of An Iúrach, which could mean "the grove of yew trees". The name of County Mayo, Ireland, is from Maigh Eo 'plain of the yew trees', using a former Old Irish word for yew.

=== Alphabets ===
In the Anglo-Saxon futhark, the thirteenth rune had a value that was possibly eu, and which was formerly taken to represent Old English eo, eow, iw meaning "yew". The Runic Poem calls it eoh, while the Codex Salisburgensis and Isruna Tracts name it ih.

In the Crann Ogham, a variation on the ancient Irish Ogham alphabet which consists of a list of trees, "yew" is the last in the main list of 20 trees, primarily symbolizing death. As the ancient Celts also believed in the transmigration of the soul, there is a secondary meaning of the eternal soul that survives death to be reborn in a new form.

== See also ==
- List of poisonous plants
- List of plants poisonous to equines
