= Florence Court Yew =

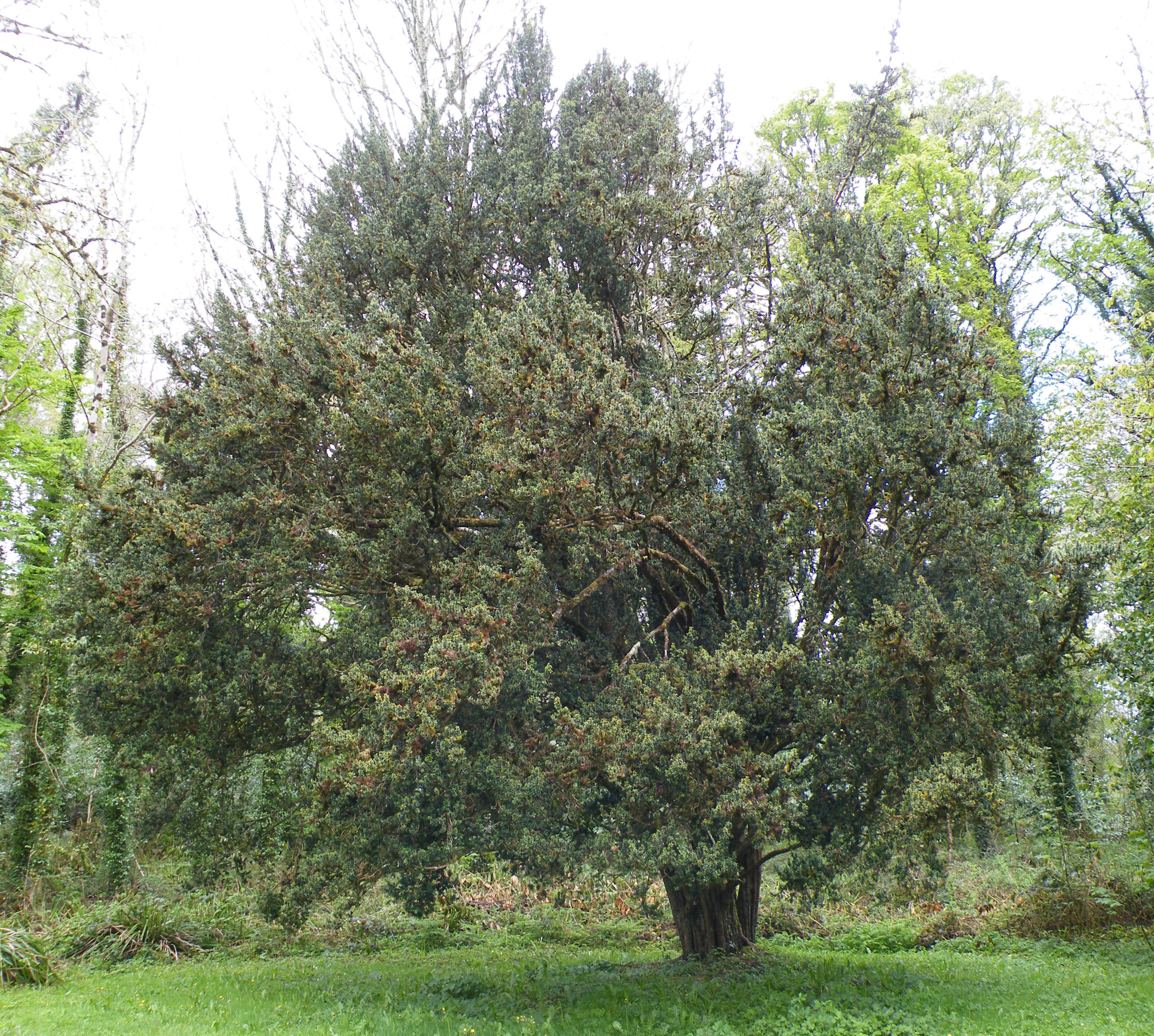
- Florence Court Yew in 2010
- Interactive map of Florence Court Yew
- Species: Yew (Taxus baccata)
- Location: Florence Court, County Fermanagh, Northern Ireland
- Coordinates: 54.254077°N 7.722987°W
- Date seeded: 1767
- Custodian: National Trust for Places of Historic Interest or Natural Beauty

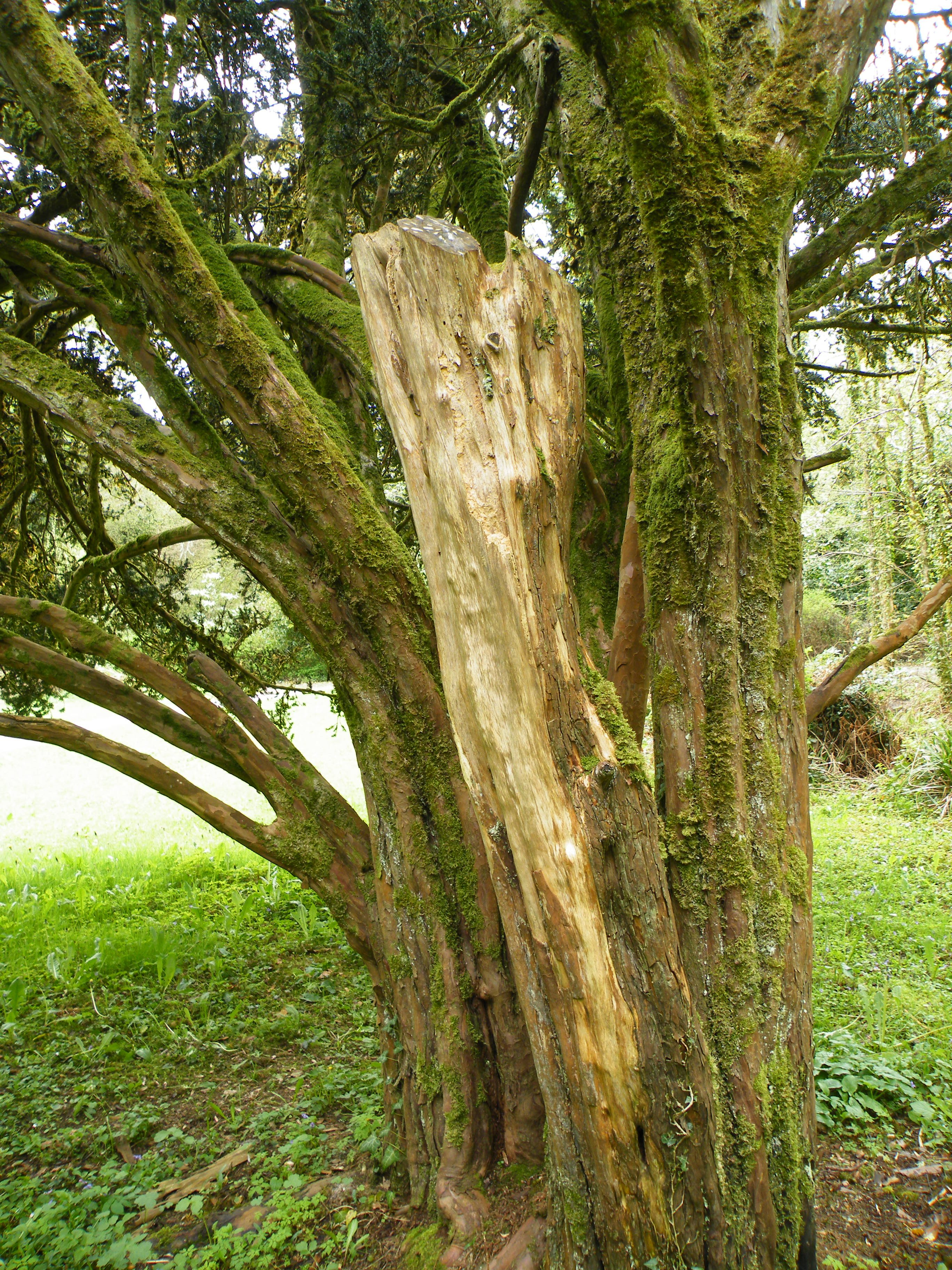
Trunk of the Florence Court Yew

The Florence Court Yew is the surviving specimen of the two original Irish yew (Taxus baccata 'Fastigiata') seedlings. As such, it is the oldest Irish yew alive and it is believed that almost all Irish yews worldwide descend from this specimen. It is located in Florence Court demesne in County Fermanagh, Northern Ireland and is cared for by the National Trust.

== History ==
In 1767 George Willis, a local farmer, retrieved a pair of unusual yew seedlings from the slopes of Cuilcagh mountain in the Aghatirourke townland, near Florencecourt, County Fermanagh. One specimen was presented to Willis' landlord, Lord Mount Florence (later 1st Earl of Enniskillen) who had it planted in the old garden in the Florence Court estate. The other was planted in Willis' own garden, where it died in 1865.

== Characteristics ==
The specimens Willis discovered had a 'fastigiated' or vertical habit in contrast to the wider spread of the common yew seen throughout the British Isles and Europe. The characteristics of the young seedlings survived into maturity and the tree attracted interest from visitors and horticulturists due to its compactness and attractive columnar shape.

== Propagation ==
Like all Irish yews, the Florence Court Yew is female. The species can only be propagated from cuttings as specimens raised from seed revert to common yews. They lose the Irish yew's distinctive upright habit, although specimens raised from seed may display minor variations in foliage colour.

Cuttings for propagation were taken from the tree and by 1820 the Irish yew had become so popular that the tree was commercially reproduced. The Irish yew is common in churchyards throughout the world and it is believed almost all specimens are descended from the tree at Florence Court.

== Condition and conservation ==
As a result of the volume of cuttings taking from the tree and the shade of larger ash and sycamore trees surrounding it, the Florence Court Yew has lost much of the characteristic shape and balance of its species. As of 2010, the condition of the tree was stable although moss, which thrives in the tree's damp location, was slowing the tree's growth.

== See also ==
- List of individual trees

== Notes ==
- The species of this plant has also been referred to as Taxus florencecourtiaiana.
