= Balderschwang =

- Municipality
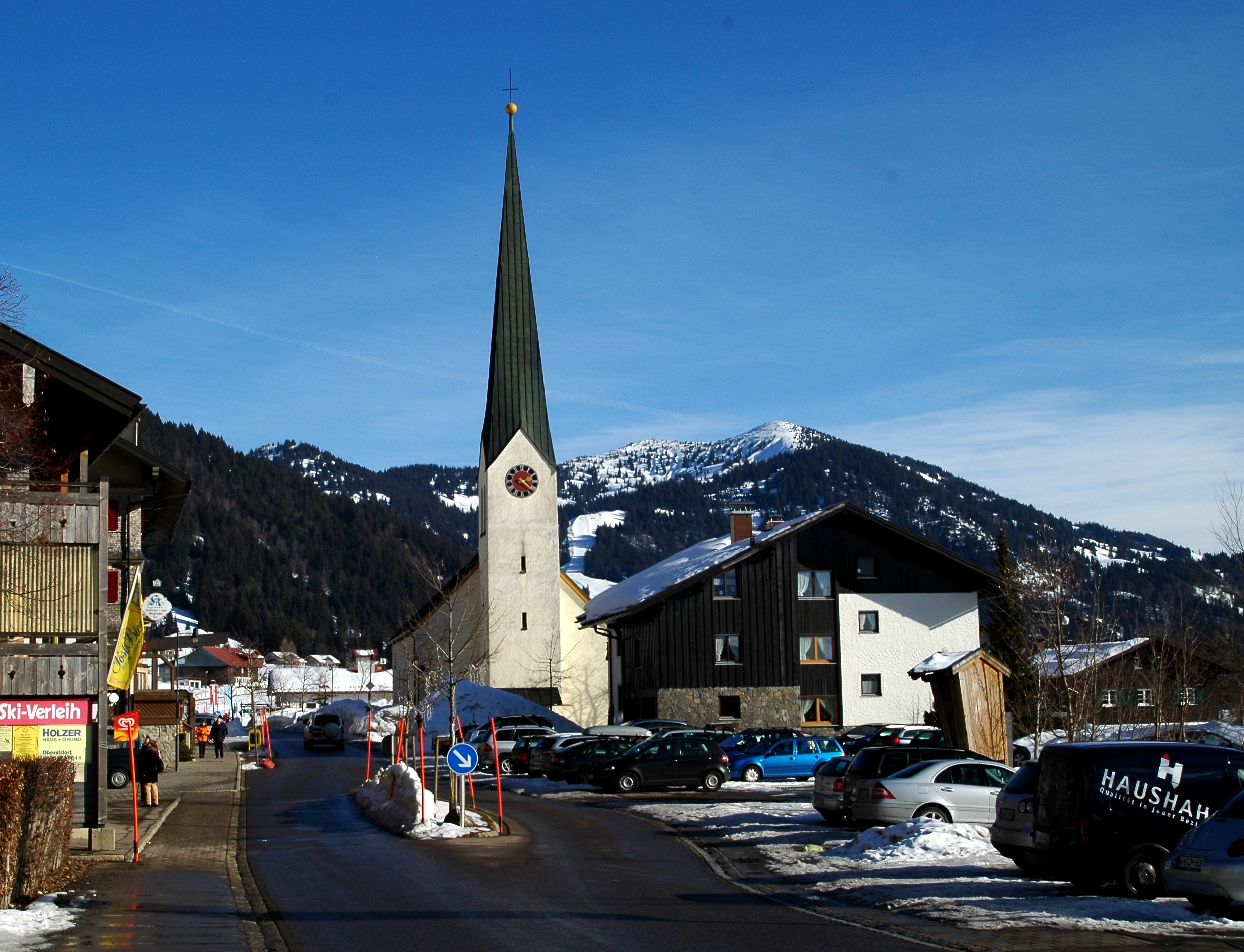
- Center of the village

- Coat of arms

- Location of Balderschwang within Oberallgäu district
- Interactive map of Balderschwang
- Location within Germany Location within Bavaria
- Coordinates: 47°28′N 10°6′E
- Country: Germany
- State: Bavaria
- Admin. region: Schwaben
- District: Oberallgäu
- Municipal assoc.: Hörnergruppe

Government
  - Mayor (2020–26): Konrad Kienle (CSU)

Area
  - Total: 41.75 km^{2} (16.12 sq mi)
- Elevation: 1,044 m (3,425 ft)

Population (2025-12-31)
  - Total: 388
  - Density: 9.29/km^{2} (24.1/sq mi)
- Time zone: UTC+01:00 (CET)
  - Summer (DST): UTC+02:00 (CEST)
- Postal codes: 87538
- Dialling codes: 08328
- Vehicle registration: OA
- Website: www.balderschwang.de

Balderschwang (German pronunciation: [ˈbaldɐʃvaŋ]) is a municipality in the district of Oberallgäu in Bavaria in Germany.

== Heraldry ==
Coat of arms of Balderschwang	Coat of arms of Balderschwang Blazon: In silver, above a green triple mount, a three-pointed red flag with golden fringes and three golden rings, on which a golden heraldic fleur-de-lis is superimposed.

== See also ==
- Balderschwang Yew
