= Balderschwang Yew =

Tree in Bavaria, Germany

Coordinates: 47°28′05.6″N 10°06′55.5″E

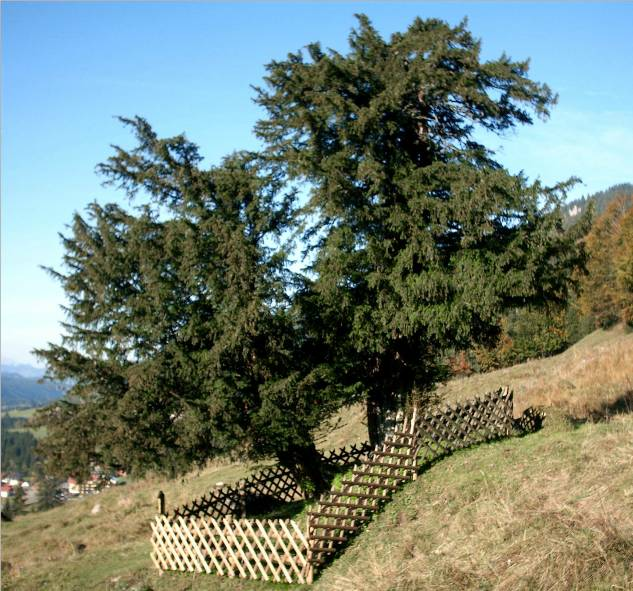
Seen from the east

The Balderschwang Yew (German: Alte Eibe von Balderschwang) is an ancient European yew (Taxus baccata) in Bavaria. It has two hollow trunks and stands alone on a mountain pasture. It is estimated to be between 600 and 1,000 years old, and is possibly the oldest tree in Germany.

== Location ==
The yew is found near Balderschwang in Oberallgäu, Bavaria, at an elevation of 1,150 meters (3,773 ft), a few hundred metres above the municipality and exposed on a seasonal mountain pasture. Its location is to the northeast of Balderschwang and to the west of Sonthofen; it overlooks the rolling foothills of the Bavarian Alpine Foreland.

== The tree ==
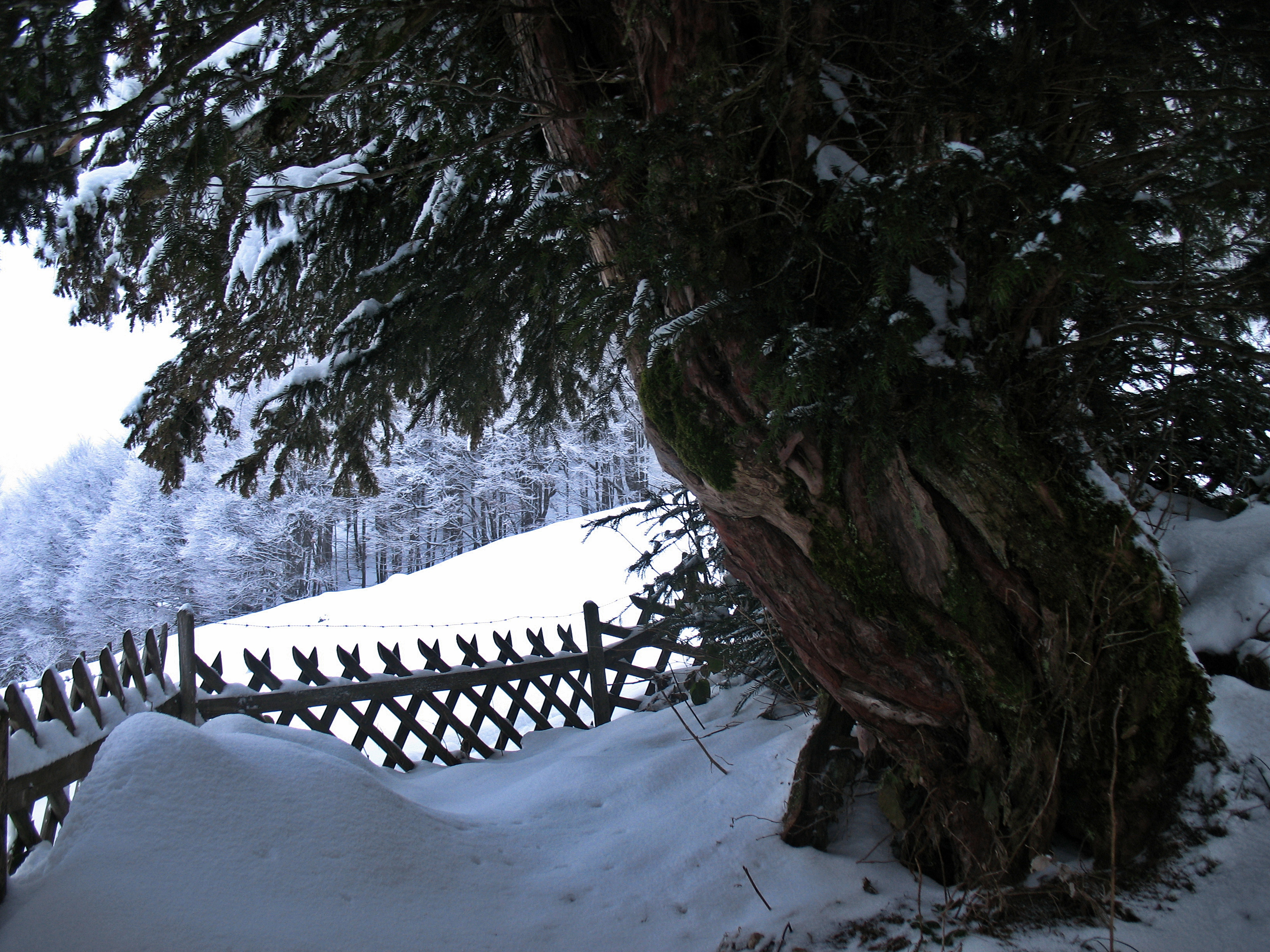
Detail of the valley-side trunk

The yew has two separate trunks. The comparison of morphological features of the leaves and the time of their sprouting suggested that the trunks belonged to the same root system and a DNA test proved that they form a single organism. It is not known whether a central trunk existed: Ullrich, Kühn, and Kühn mention the possibility that the trunks regrew from a stump left after a forest clearing or natural decay, but also mention the opinion of other experts who believe the tree always had two trunks.

The circumferences of the trunks at the point of their smallest diameter were measured in 2000 to 2.40 meters (7.87 ft) and 2.00 meters (6.56 ft) metres, and the total circumference was measured in 2007 at 7.00 meters (22.97 ft) metres. The crown of the tree is 7 meters (23 ft) tall.

The tree has been battered by storms and the weight of snow lying on the branches. The trunks are hollow but the tree's foliage is complete and it still sends out fresh shoots. The yew is female.

== Age ==
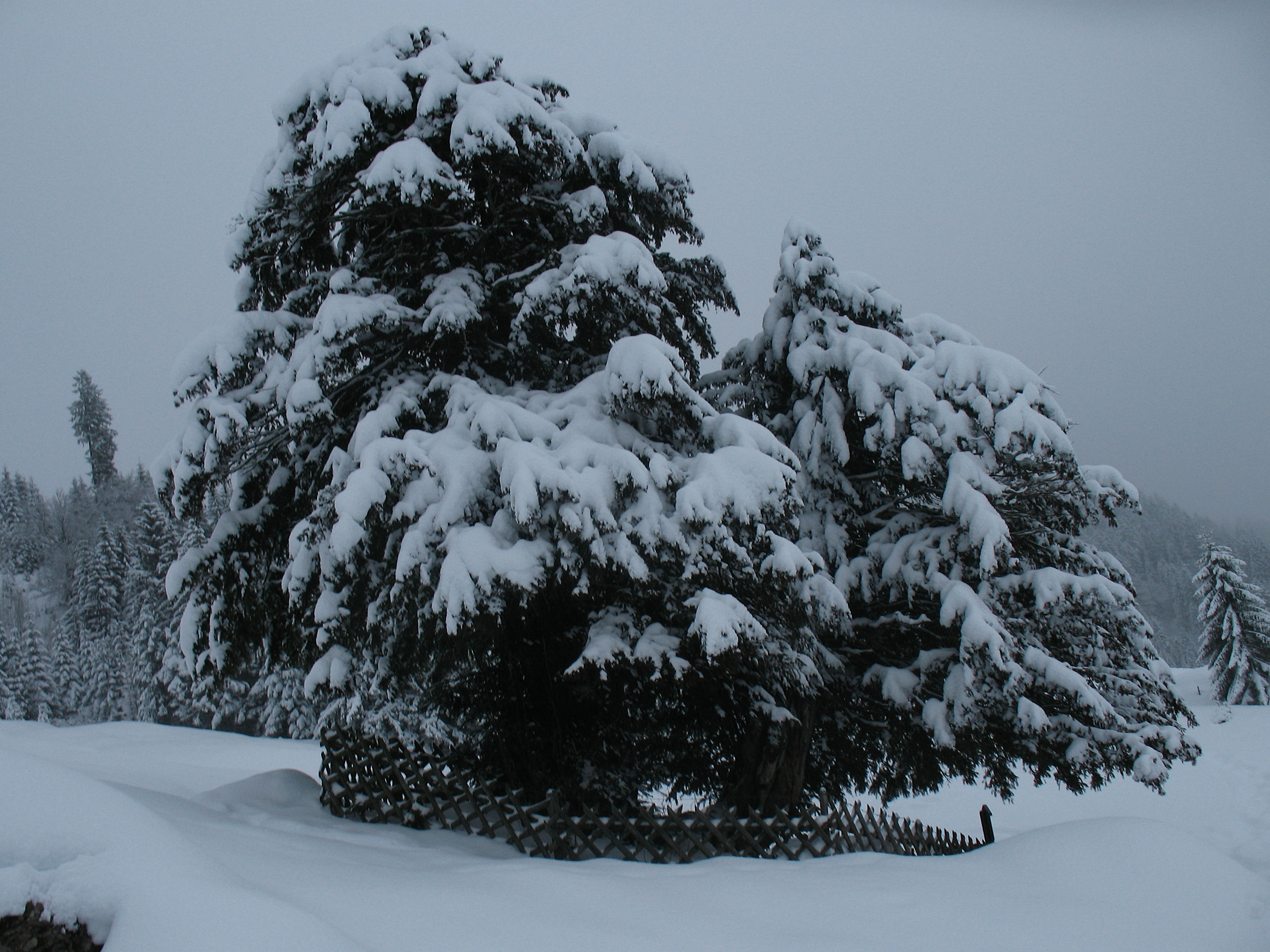
Seen from the west

The tree possesses the characteristics of an ancient yew and its age was estimated at between 600 and 1,000 years. Ullrich, Kühn, and Kühn estimated an age of up to 800 years, even if the trunks have not regrown from a stump. If they have, the tree would be much older.

== See also ==
- List of individual trees
