= Gasparo Duiffopruggar =

German instrument maker (1514 - c.1570)

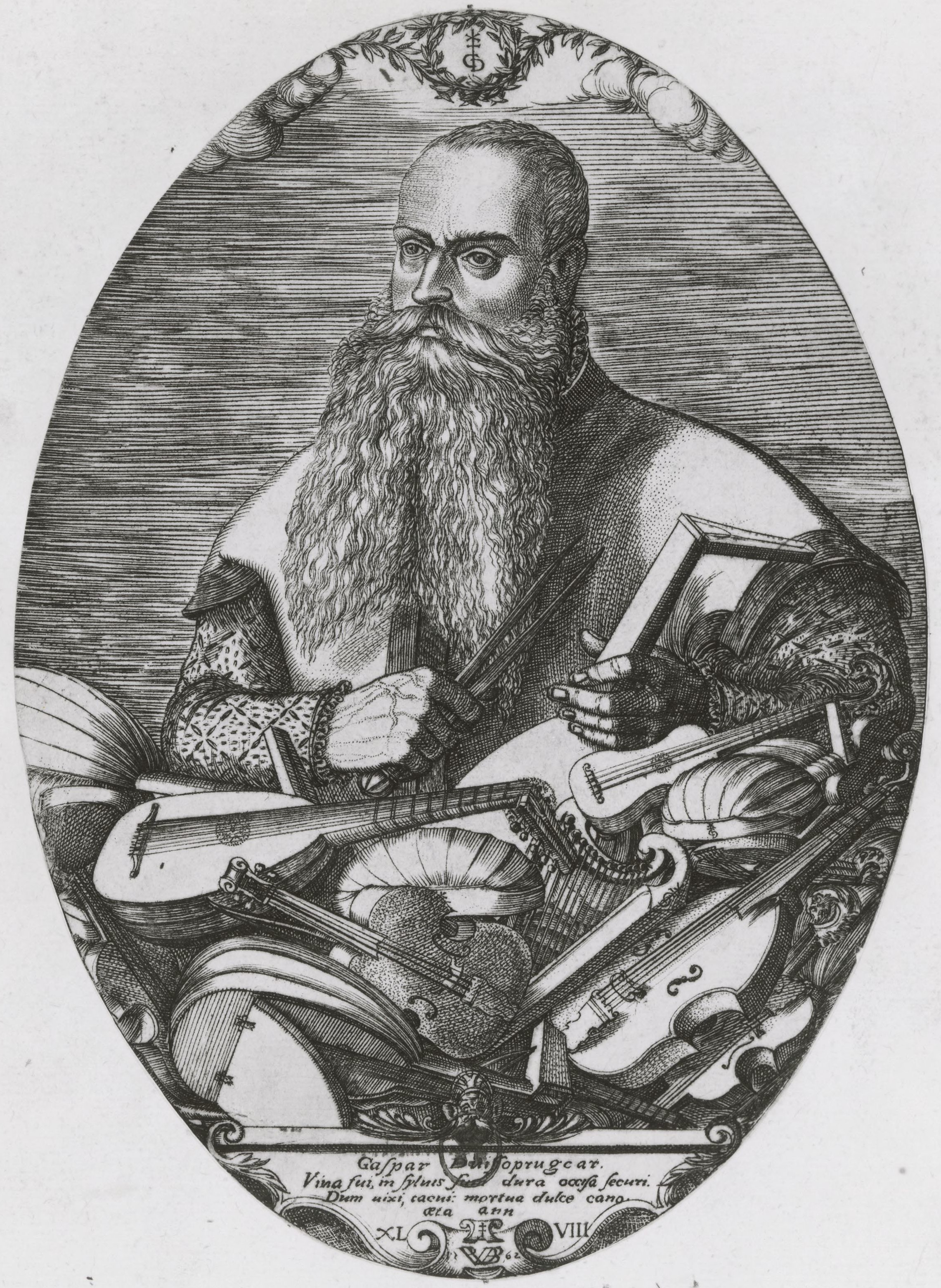
Gasparo Duiffopruggar, engraving by Pierre Woeiriot (1532–1599)

Gasparo Duiffopruggar (1514 – c. 1570) was an instrument maker. His originally German family name was also spelled Tieffenbrucker, Tiefenbrugger, Tiefenbrucker, Teufenbrugger, Tuiffenbrugger, Deuffenbrugger, Dieffopruchar, Dieffoprughar, Duyfautbrocard, Duiffopruggar, Duiffoprugcar, Dubrocard, Dieffoprukhar, Diafopruchar, Thiphobrucar, Fraburgadi, his first name also Kaspar, Caspar or Gaspard. Duiffopruggar is believed to have been born near Füssen in Bavaria, Germany, and had moved to Lyon, France, where he did most of his work, by 1553. He was one of the first to produce the violin in its modern form.

Duiffopruggar instruments are rare and tend to be of the viol family. Most instruments bearing his labels are imagined reproductions of his instruments. The best examples come from the workshop of the Parisian violin-maker, Jean-Baptiste Vuillaume. They were made for Vuillaume by Honoré Derazey (1794–1883) and sold to the public to supply the demand for older instruments. These instruments can be distinguished from the originals, however, by discrepancies in the labels of the violin, and more importantly, the workmanship and type of the instrument.

Because no violin has ever been actually discovered to have been made by Tieffenbrucker, the current belief is that "Duiffopruggar" never actually made any violins, but rather that he made almost only lutes and sold different instruments of other makers, and his name was used to sell a brand of commercial instruments made for Vuillaume.

== Bibliography ==
- Farga, Franz, Violins & Violinists. Trans. Egon Larson with Bruno Raikin. New York: Frederick A. Prager, 1969.
- "The Tieffenbrucker family and its collaborators", ch. XVI in Viol and Lute Makers of Venice 1490–1630 by Stefano Pio (2012), Ed. Venice Research, ISBN 9788890725203. Abstract and index
