= Tieffenbrucker =

Tieffenbrucker is a large multigenerational family of luthiers, originally from Bavaria, active in Venice and Padua, Italy from the beginning of the 16th century till around 1630. Several of their 16th- and 17th-century lutes are on display at the Lobkowicz Palace in Prague and the Metropolitan Museum of Art in New York.

== See also ==
- Gasparo Duiffopruggar
