= La Haye-de-Routot =

- Commune
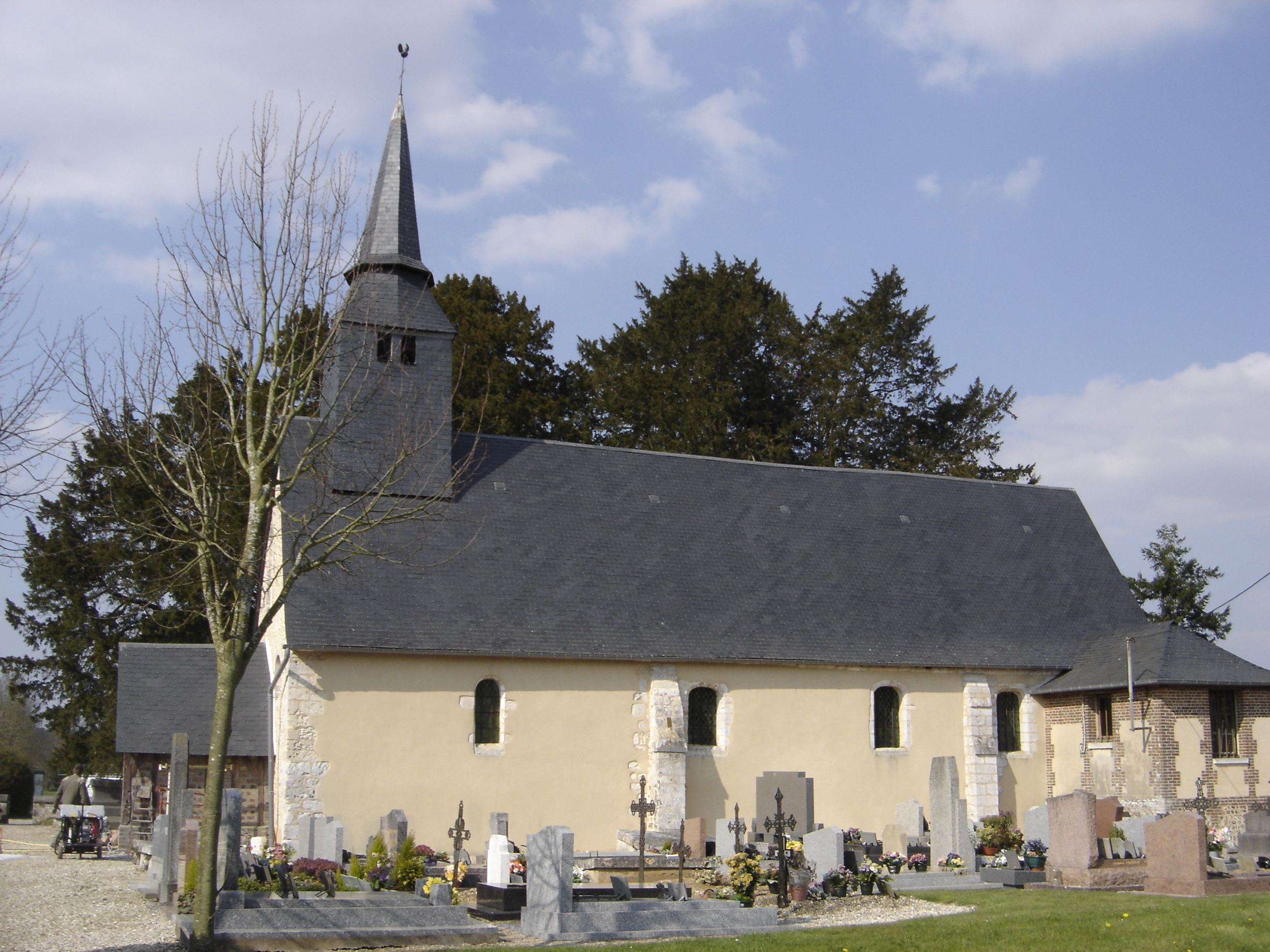
- The church of Notre-Dame in La Haye-de-Routot
- Location of La Haye-de-Routot
- Location within France Location within Normandy
- Coordinates: 49°24′19″N 0°43′42″E
- Country: France
- Region: Normandy
- Department: Eure
- Arrondissement: Bernay
- Canton: Bourg-Achard

Government
  - Mayor (2020–2026): Jacques Binet
- Area^{1}: 2.51 km^{2} (0.97 sq mi)
- Elevation: 131 m (430 ft)
- Highest elevation: 132 m (433 ft)
- Lowest elevation: 70 m (230 ft)
- Population (2023): 285
  - Density: 114/km^{2} (294/sq mi)
- Time zone: UTC+01:00 (CET)
  - Summer (DST): UTC+02:00 (CEST)
- INSEE/Postal code: 27319 /27350
- ^{1} French Land Register data, which excludes lakes, ponds, glaciers > 1 km^{2} (0.386 sq mi or 247 acres) and river estuaries.

La Haye-de-Routot (French pronunciation: [la ɛ də ʁuto]) is a commune in the Eure department in north-western France. It is located on the border of Seine-Maritime, south of the Forêt de Brotonne.

== Population ==
Historical population
Year	Pop.	±% p.a.
1968	148	—
1975	172	+2.17%
1982	197	+1.96%
1990	227	+1.79%
1999	256	+1.34%
2007	256	+0.00%
2012	286	+2.24%
2017	305	+1.29%
2023	285	−1.12%
Source: INSEE

== Sights ==
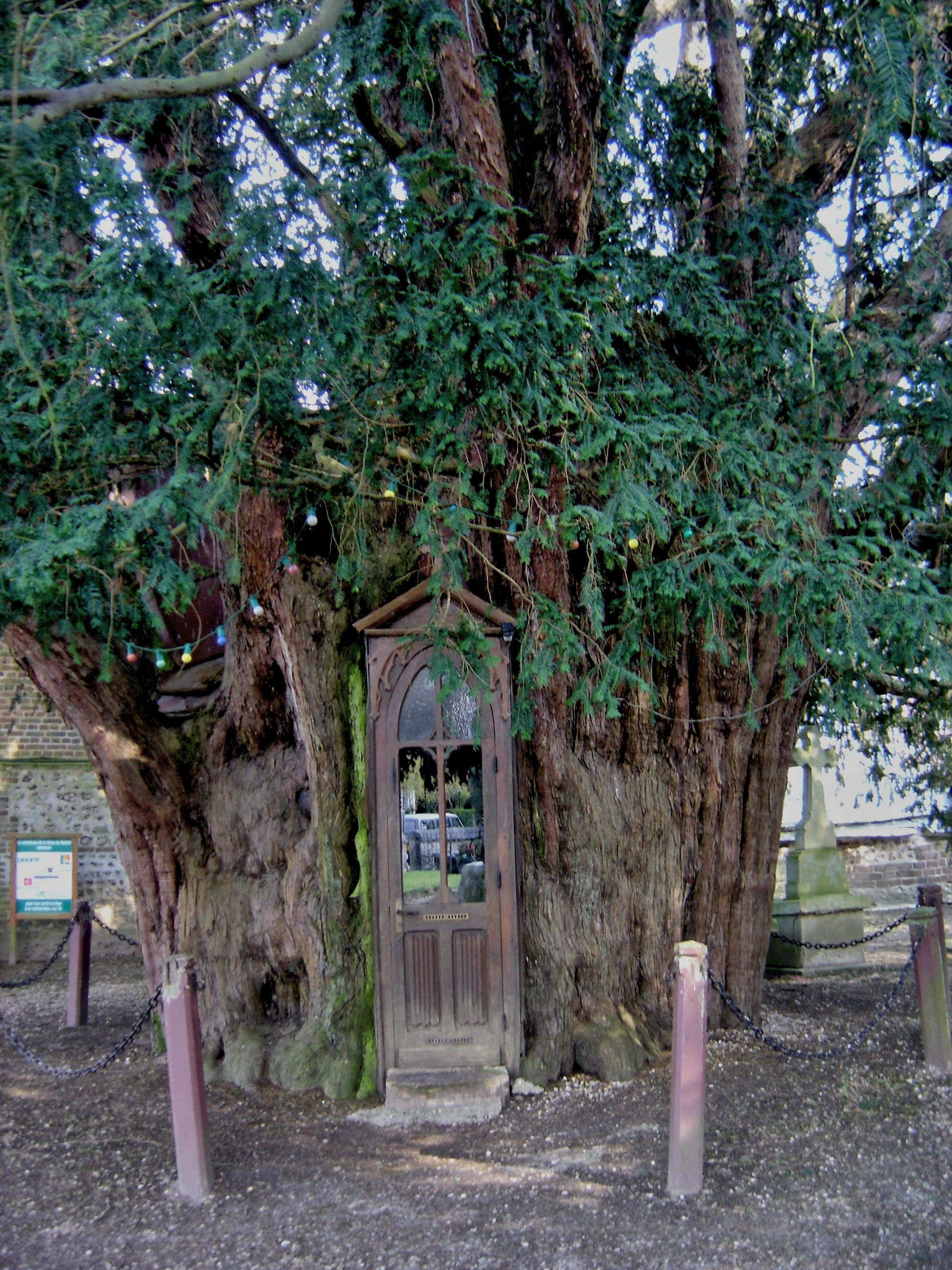
The Chapelle de Sainte-Anne in a yew tree.

- Shoe museum
- The tiny Chapelle de Sainte-Anne which is carved into a yew tree

== See also ==
- Communes of the Eure department
