= Emilia-Romagna luthiers =

Emilia-Romagna luthiers lists notable violin makers from what is now the modern Italian state of Emilia-Romagna.

== Relevant Italian violin-makers based in Emilia-Romagna ==
- Franco Albanelli (Bologna 1933-2007)
- Otello Bignami (Bologna 1914-1989)
- Marino Capicchioni (San Marino, 1895 - Rimini, 1977)
- Carlo Carletti (Pieve di Cento 1873-1941)
- Natale Carletti (Pieve di Cento 1904-1979)
- Giovanni Cavani (Spilamberto 1851-1936)
- Giuseppe Fiorini (Bazzano - Bologna 1861-1934)
- Raffaele Fiorini (Musiano di Pian di Macina, Pianoro - Bologna 1828-1898)
- Arturo Fracassi (Cesena 1899-1973)
- Orsolo Gotti (Pieve di Cento 1867-1922)
- Giovanni Battista Guadagnini (Bilegno - Piacenza 1711-1786)
- Gian Carlo Guicciardi (Spilamberto, Modena 1940-)
- Floriano Guidanti (Bologna ca. 1643-1715)
- Giovanni Guidanti (Bologna 1687-1760)
- Giuseppe Lepri (Santarcangelo - 1896-1976)
- Mario Maccaferri (Cento 1900-1993)
- Folgenzio Malagoli (Modena 1850-1892)
- Custode Marcucci (Lugo 1865-1951)
- Giovanni Marchi (Bologna 1727-1807)
- Nicolò Marchioni (Don Nicola Amati) (Bologna ca. 1643-1715)
- Pietro Messori (Modena 1870–1952)
- Luigi Mingazzi (Ravenna 1859-1933)
- Armando Monterumici (Vedrana di Budrio - Bologna 1875-1936)
- Paolo Morara (Bologna 1889-1958)
- Luigi Mozzani (Faenza, Bologna, Cento 1869-1943)
- Ansaldo Poggi (Villafontana di Medicina - Bologna 1893-1984)
- Augusto Pollastri (Bologna 1877-1927)
- Cesare Pollastri (Bologna 1925-1998)
- Gaetano Pollastri (Bologna 1886-1960)
- Roberto Regazzi (Bologna 1956-)
- Sesto Rocchi (Reggio Emilia 1909-1991)
- Elisa Scrollavezza
- Renato Scrollavezza (Castelnuovo Fogliano - Parma 1927-)
- Gaetano Sgarabotto (Vicenza - Parma 1878-1959)
- Pietro Sgarabotto (Milano - Parma 1903–1990)
- Giuseppe Sgarbi (Finale Emilia 1818-1905)
- Ettore Soffritti (Ferrara 1877–1928)
- Luigi Soffritti (Ferrara 1860–1996)
- Maurizio Spignoli (Bagno di Romagna 1958 - Bologna 2007)
- Nicola Utili (Castelbolognese 1888-1948)
- Carlo Annibale Tononi (Bologna 1675-1730)
- Giovanni Tononi (Bologna ca. 1640-1713)
- Raffaele Vaccari (Lentigione 1908-1994)
- Andrea Zanrè
- Aldo Capelli (Cervia-Cesena 1923-2008)

.....

== More documents by City ==
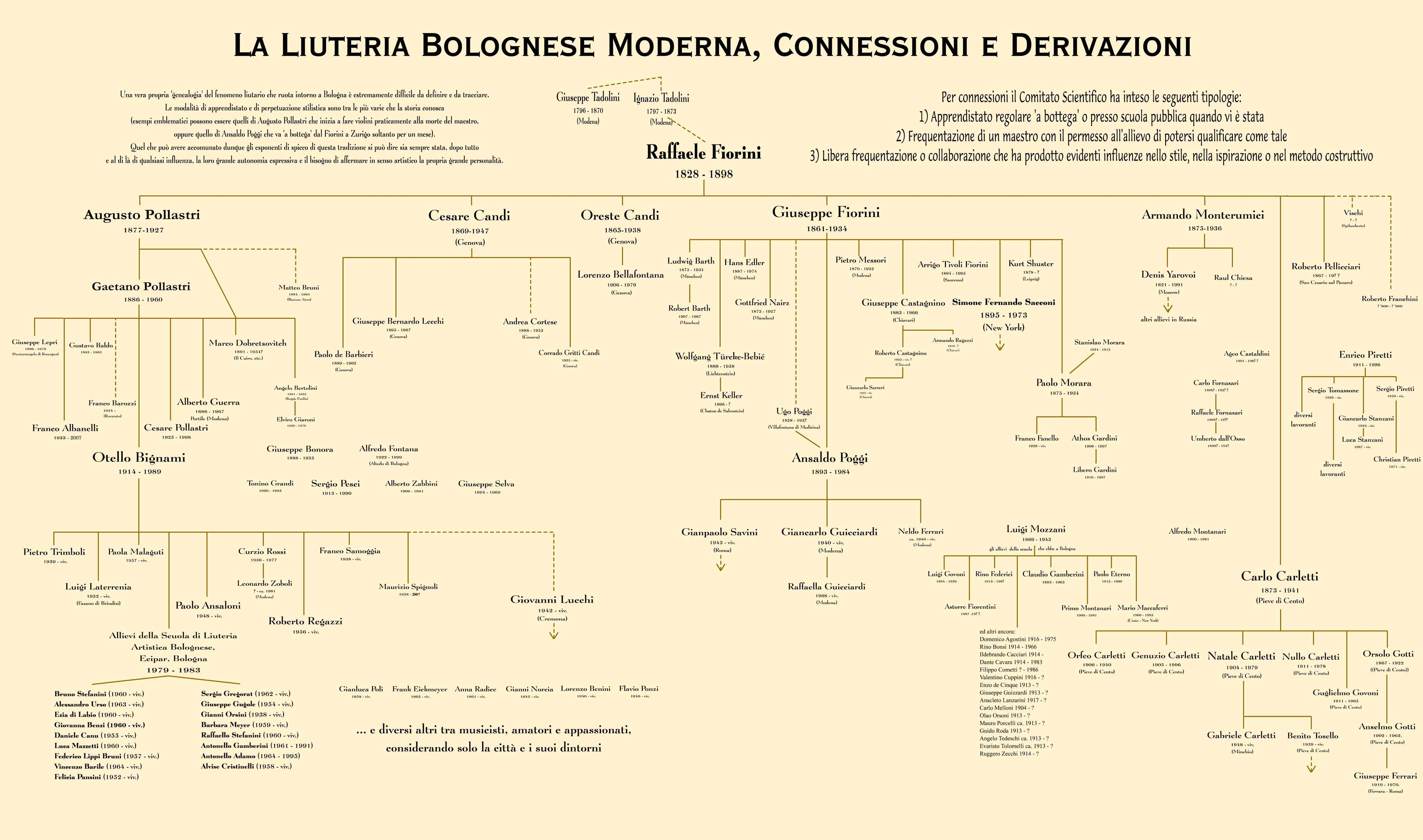
Modern Bolognese Violin-Making Table

== Bibliography ==
- Sandro Pasqual, Roberto Regazzi, Lutherie in Bologna (1998).
- Rosengard, Duane Giovanni Battista Guadagnini, The life and achievement of a master maker of violins (2000).
- Versari Artemio, Modern Violin Making in the Emilia-Romagna Region (2002).
- The Sound of Bologna (2002).
