= Raffaele Fiorini =

Italian luthier (1828–1898)

Raffaele Fiorini (15 July 1828 – 18 October 1898) was an influential Italian violin maker.

Innovator and pioneer of the rebirth of Bolognese violinmaking, Fiorini was born at Musiano di Pian di Macina di Pianoro near Bologna. He spent his early years in Bazzano, where he learned the first elements of the craft while working with his father at the 'Mulino della Sega'. A well-known violin player and teacher, Professor Verardi, induced him to start the 'Bolognese adventure' and to open a workshop in the Palazzo Pepoli, not far from the Liceo Musicale, in Bologna downtown. Fiorini quickly achieved a reputation in his new environment and was able to attract apprentices, including his son Giuseppe. Raffaele won a silver medal with praise during the International Music Exhibit of Arezzo in 1882, and a silver medal during the Torino Exhibition in 1884; he received acclaim for his restoration work.

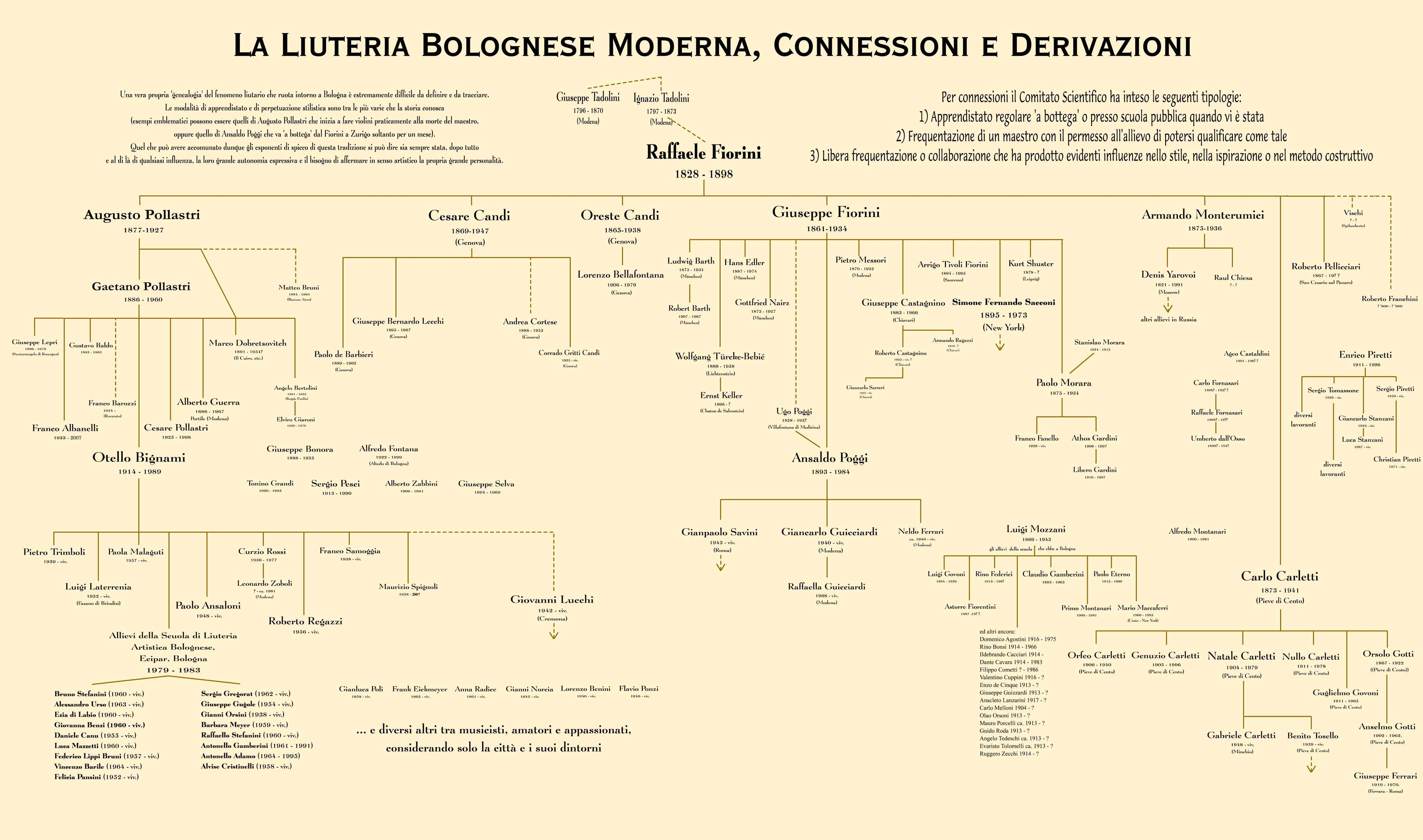
Modern Bolognese Violin-Making Table, doubleclick to enlarge it

== Biography ==
Up to the first half of the nineteenth century, violin making in Italy had come to a standstill, but during the second half of the century, Fiorini gave new impulse to it, the Luthier's ancient art was brought back to life.

He took several apprentices who, in their turn, continued his tradition during the following century. Many Bolognese luthiers have his roots in this school, including some of the bowed instrument makers of the 20th century in Italy: Augusto Pollastri, first of this luthier family, started his career as an apprentice in Fiorini's studio. Augusto took the firm's responsibility upon himself when Fiorini could not manage the workshop. After Fiorini's death Augusto Pollastri managed a luthier's Atelier in Bologna for thirty years, helped by his brother Gaetano. Augusto's total production was not high in number, yet it was of a high quality. Pollastri's instruments are today considered legendary and the model developed by him is one on the most copied in the world, besides the classical ones. In fact the number of fake instruments and imitations one could come across is much greater than the number of originals.

Gaetano, Augusto's brother, continued after his death, reaching very good results too.

Brothers Candi (Oreste & Cesare) worked in Genoa, yet they are considered Fiorini's pupils in all respects; above all, Cesare who gained distinguished international fame not only in bowed instrument making but also in plucked instruments, refined inlaying and carving.

Armando Monterumici was another Bolognese artist who apprenticed in the same workshop during the last years of the 19th century and who deserves to be known better; in fact his production is today quite rare to find.

Giuseppe, son of Fiorini, achieved a solid reputation and today is certainly considered one of the most important Italian violin makers.

Cremona too should be grateful to this scholar who, after forty years of essays, bought the rest of Stradivari's workshop (shapes, tools, original drawings, models) and donated them upon the city, in order to form a lutherie school which could bring again Italy at the top of the bowed instrument making world.

Ansaldo Poggi was Giuseppe Fiorini's pupil. His instruments are among the most sought-after and expensive instruments today. Certainly this is due in part to the instruction he had with Fiorini, to which Poggi, when alive, was proud to have been part of.

Carlo Carletti of Bologna would have been one of Fiorini's last pupils. Fiorini mentored Carletti during the last years of his life. Carletti's instruments are well known for its rich sound and precise workmanship. Following Fiorini's death, Carletti formed a strong bond with Ettore Soffritti, Augusto Pollastri and Giuseppe Fiorini.

Otello Bignami, a teacher of a part of the professional luthiers is now living and working in Bologna; he is remembered by those who knew him.

== Bibliography ==
- Il Suono di Bologna, Da Raffaele Fiorini ai grandi maestri del Novecento". Catalogo della Mostra nella chiesa di San Giorgio in Poggiale, Bologna 2002, ISBN 88-85250-06-8
- A Misura d'Uomo, Venezia 1985, ISBN 88-317-4788-6
- Paradigmi. Forme nell'Artigianato, Bologna 1988 and 1989
- Daniele Benati - Pierluigi Giordani, Stanze bolognesi - La Collezione Lauro, Bologna 1994
- Artemio Versari, "Liuteria moderna in Emilia Romagna" 2002
- Artemio Versari, "La grande liuteria italiana" 2009
- Eric Blot, Un secolo di Liuteria Italiana 1860-1960 - A century of Italian Violin Making - Emilia e Romagna I, Cremona 1994 and 2003, ISBN 88-7929-026-6, ISBN 88-88360-05-0
- Marlin Brinser, Dictionary of 20th Century Italian Violin Makers, 1978
- The Strad, January 1984, Bologna - A living tradition of Violin Making
- Vannes, Rene (1985) [1951]. Dictionnaire Universel del Luthiers (vol.3). Bruxelles: Les Amis de la musique. OCLC 53749830.
- William, Henley (1969). Universal Dictionary of Violin & Bow Makers. Brighton; England: Amati. ISBN 0-901424-00-5.
- Walter Hamma, Meister Italienischer Geigenbaukunst, Wilhelmshaven 1993, ISBN 3-7959-0537-0

== Living Museum ==
Discover the history of the Bolognese School Bolognese Violin Makers

'Up to the first half of the nineteenth century, Violin Making in Italy was in a standstill cycle; yet, during the second half of the century, Raffaele Fiorini it:Fiorini Raffaele gave new impulse to it. Thanks to him, born in Musiano di Pianoro, the luthier's ancient Art was brought back to a new life.' - History
