= Pollastri =

Pollastri is an Italian surname. Notable people with it include:

- Augusto Pollastri (1877–1927), Italian violin maker
- Bartolomeo Pollastri (... – 18th century), Italian mathematician and astronomer
- Gaetano Pollastri (1886–1960), Italian luthier
