= Roberto Regazzi =

Italian luthier (b.1956)

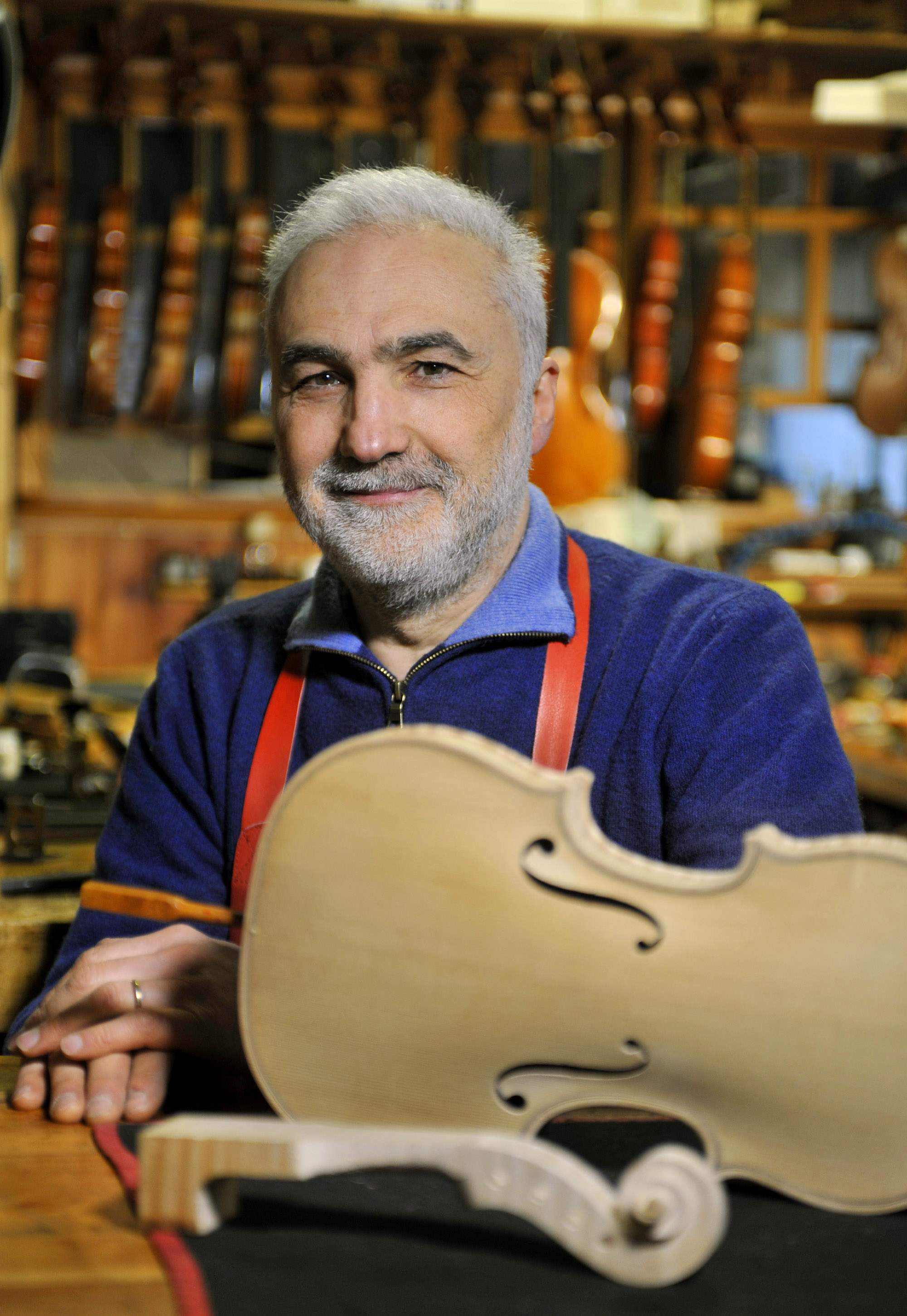
Roberto Regazzi in Bologna

Roberto Regazzi (born 20 August 1956 in Bologna, Italy) is a notable contemporary violin maker and scholar who received his initiation in the craft from Otello Bignami. Regazzi lives and works in Bologna.

== Biography ==
Regazzi's debut was at an early age. When he was 14 years old, he became involved in the construction of musical instruments, at that time mostly classical guitars, under the guidance of Alan Wilcox and Renato Scrollavezza in the mid 1970s.

Later, the possibility to become a home pupil of Otello Bignami was crucial for his decision to stop the studies at the Bologna University (Physics) to become a professional violin maker.

Established and well known worldwide for the high quality of his instruments, he has been president of a number of specialized organizations including the European Association of Violin and Bow Makers.

His violins are clear examples of the Italianate sound.

Just before the advent of the new millennium, his production started to be inspired by Guarneri del Gesù, with the achievement of a rich and full sonority. His work is also inspired by Giuseppe Fiorini, Ansaldo Poggi and Augusto Pollastri (modern Bolognese School).

In 2006 the Chamber of Commerce of Bologna conferred on him an honour in recognition of his work. In 2018 the Fondazione Cologni wanted to have him in the Golden Book of the MAM (Maestro d'Arte e Mestiere), a sort of Grammy Award for handicraft activities."Roberto Regazzi :: MAM – Maestro d'Arte e Mestieri".

Many are the performers and musicians who have bought and play or have ordered his instruments, including Boris Belkin, Franco Mezzena, Anne-Sophie Mutter, Ruggiero Ricci, Salvatore Greco, Giovanni Adamo, Uto Ughi, Franco Gulli, Anastasiya Petryshak, Sonia Slany, Riccardo Brengola, the Quartetto di Venezia, Igor Ozim, Peter Fisher and many others.

The Regazzi Library is a large collection of books, articles and documents about musical instruments, considered a unique piece in the world.

He has been on the jury of a number of contests for luthiers, including the 10th International Competition of the Violin Society of America at Carlisle, Pennsylvania (1992), the Freiburg Baden-Württemberg Internationaler Geigenbauwettbewerb Jacobus Stainer (1996), the 5th Baveno Violin Making Competition, the 2nd Concourse in S.M. della neve of Pisogne and the prestigious 10th (2001) and 14th (2021, as a Chairman Jury Member) Henryk Wieniawski Violin-Making Competition, the oldest event of this kind in the world.

He also made several classical concert guitars starting in the 1970s, up to the end of the 1980s, mostly made out of top selected quality Brazilian rosewood and quite special western red cedar and Italian or American spruce.

Every instrument is labelled and branded with iron from the beginning of his artistic career.

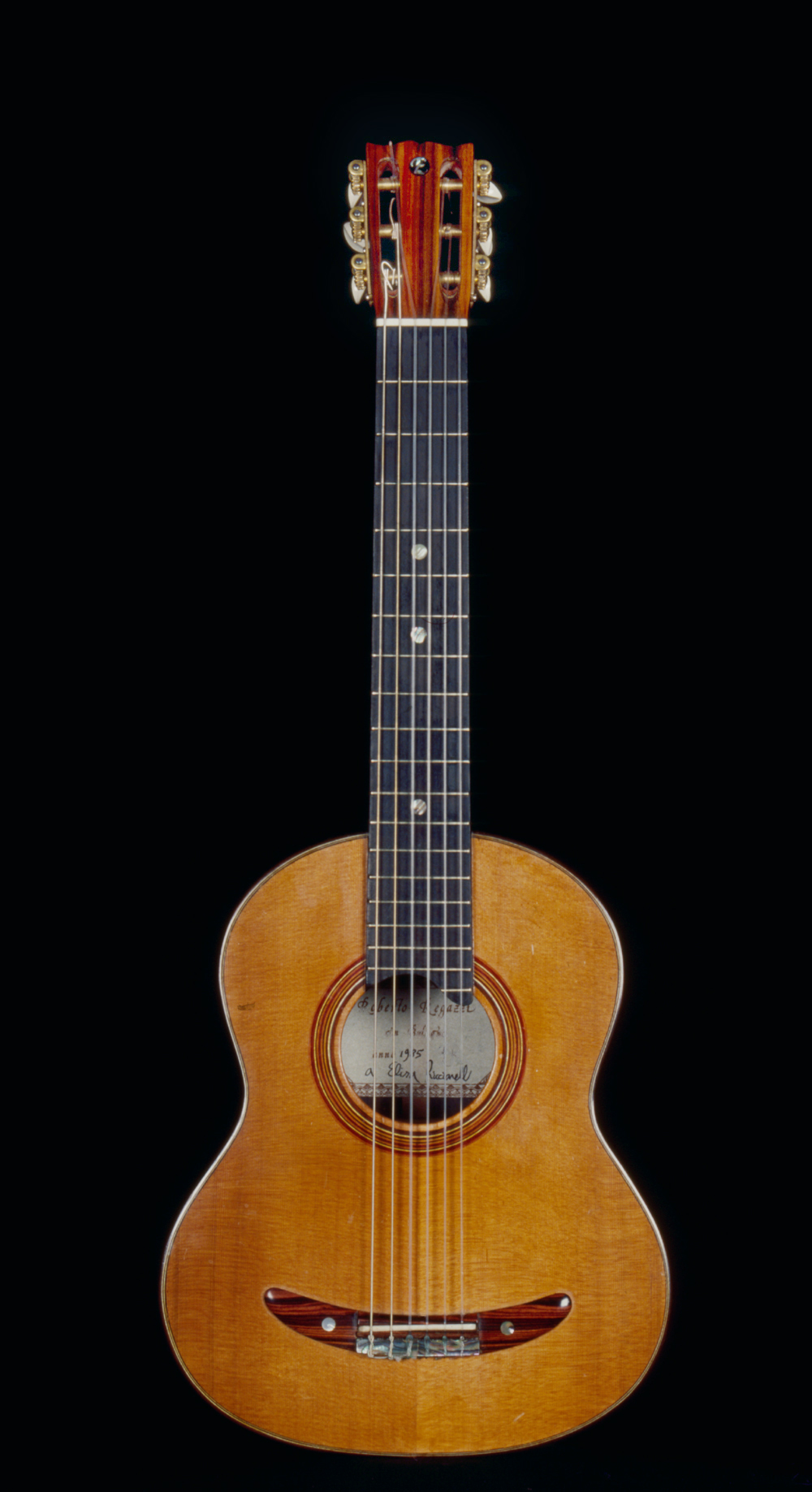
Guitar for travels, 1985

He has written books, lectured around the world and organised cultural events relating to his art and profession.

Regazzi is the first luthier from Bologna having been chosen as an official testimonial for the Craft of Traditional Musical Instrument Making at the Bologna Shanghai 2010 Expo.

In the same period he was also the creator and developer of the wiihang, a kind of prepared handpan which uses the infrared technology to be coupled with a specially adapted synthesizer.

== Publications ==
- In occasione del 250º anniversario della morte di Antonio Stradivari per onorare la figura di Giuseppe Fiorini, Bazzano, 1987
- In remembrance of Ansaldo Poggi, Bologna, Florenus 1994
- The Complete Luthier's Library, Bologna, Florenus 1990
- The Manuscript on Violin Making by G.A. Marchi - Bologna 1786, Bologna, Arnaldo Forni 1986

== Publications - Contributions ==
- 36 ème Congrès national de Lutherie et Archetèrie d'art. Conférences de Eric Blot & Roberto Regazzi, Montpellier – Le Corum 1994, ad ind.
- "A comprehensive investigation of mechanical and acoustic modifications in wood treated with high doses of gamma radiation for sterilization", in Radiation Effects and Defects in Solids, 171:9–10, 714–725, DOI: 10.1080/10420150.2016.1253089 http://dx.doi.org/10.1080/10420150.2016.1253089
- A Life of Artistry – Sketches of Otello Bignami violin maker in Bologna 1914–1989, with Roberto Verti, Adriano Cavicchi and Giovanna Benzi, Bologna, Florenus Edizioni, 1991
- "A new analytical approach to characterize the effect of γ-ray sterilization on wood", in Microchemical Journal 143 (2018) pp. 493–502 https://doi.org/10.1016/j.microc.2018.08.001
- "A scuola da Otello", in Jadranka Bentini and Piero Mioli (eds.), Maestri di Musica al Martini, I musicisti del Novecento che hanno fatto la storia di Bologna e del suo Conservatorio, Bologna, 2021, pp. 345–348 ISBN 978-88-3364-351-9
- "Amati [Melchioni, Marchioni], Nicolò", in New Grove – Grove Music Online, Oxford Music Online, 2001: https://doi.org/10.1093/gmo/9781561592630.article.00738
- Ansaldo nei racconti di chi lo ha conosciuto, lecture given at the "Giornata di studi a cura dei membri del Comitato tecnico-scientifico della mostra Ansaldo Poggi", Medicina, 1 ott 2024 https://www.youtube.com/watch?v=hVy8SO576Ts&t=4730s
- "Ansaldo, liutaio per missione", in Jadranka Bentini and Piero Mioli (eds.), Maestri di Musica al Martini, I musicisti del Novecento che hanno fatto la storia di Bologna e del suo Conservatorio, Bologna, 2021, pp. 341–344 ISBN 978-88-3364-351-9
- "Ansaldo Poggi, part 1" by Dmitry Gindin and Roberto Regazzi in The Cozio Carteggio, Tarisio.com, 15 May 2019: https://web.archive.org/web/20211023084945/https://tarisio.com/cozio-archive/cozio-carteggio/ansaldo-poggi-part-1/
- "Ansaldo Poggi, part 2" by Dmitry Gindin with the collaboration of Roberto Regazzi in The Cozio Carteggio, Tarisio.com, 22 May 2019: https://web.archive.org/web/20211130172314/https://tarisio.com/cozio-archive/cozio-carteggio/ansaldo-poggi-part-2/
- "Ansaldo Poggi 1893–1984" in The Strad magazine, January 1985 (Obituary, p. 643)
- "Ansaldo Poggi centenary concert" in The Strad magazine, February 1994
- Ansaldo Poggi lo Stradivari del Novecento – Un percorso nell'eccellenza della liuteria italiana attraverso i violini del maestro medicinese a cura di Raffaella Guicciardi, Andrea Zanrè & Comitato Tecnico-Scientifico (Gian Carlo Guicciardi, Elisa Scrollavezza, Paolo Bandini, Roberto Regazzi, Lorenzo Frignani, Enrico Caprara, Gloria Malavasi). Medicina 1–13 ottobre 2024
- "Poggi, Ansaldo" in Dizionario Biografico degli Italiani – Volume 84 (2015)
- "Pollastri, Augusto", by Jaak Liivoja-Lorius and Roberto Regazzi in New Grove – Grove Music Online, Oxford Music Online, https://doi.org/10.1093/gmo/9781561592630.article.44327
- Augusto and Gaetano Pollastri, part 1, by Dmitry Gindin with the collaboration of Roberto Regazzi, 20 March 2019: https://web.archive.org/web/20190504092806/https://tarisio.com/cozio-archive/cozio-carteggio/augusto-and-gaetano-pollastri-part-1/
- Between Bologna and Stradivari. The European journeys of Giuseppe Fiorini, Cremona-Bologna 2011, Edizioni Novecento
- Bignami, Otello in New Grove – Grove Music Online, Oxford Music Online: https://www.oxfordmusiconline.com/grovemusic/view/10.1093/gmo/9781561592630.001.0001/omo-9781561592630-e-0000052227, https://doi.org/10.1093/gmo/9781561592630.article.52227
- "Carving a pioneering path" [the life of Alvina de Ferenczy] in The Strad magazine, August 2015
- Characterisation of varnishes used in violins by pyrolysis-gas chromatography/mass spectrometry, in Rapid Commun. Mass Spectrom. 2008; 22
- Classic Violin-making in Piedmonte, Bologna, Florenus Edizioni, 1991
- "Fiorini's favourite pupil" in The Strad magazine, September 1994
- "Giuseppe Fiorini" in Arte Liutaria, Florence, 1988, n. 11, pp. 29–32
- Gli Asteroidi, a movie by Germano Maccioni, 2016
- "I Fiorini e il Rinascimento", in Jadranka Bentini and Piero Mioli (eds.), Maestri di Musica al Martini, I musicisti del Novecento che hanno fatto la storia di Bologna e del suo Conservatorio, Bologna, 2021, pp. 333–336 ISBN 978-88-3364-351-9
- "I Pollastri da Castiglione a S.Martino", in Jadranka Bentini and Piero Mioli (eds.), Maestri di Musica al Martini, I musicisti del Novecento che hanno fatto la storia di Bologna e del suo Conservatorio, Bologna, 2021, pp. 337–340 ISBN 978-88-3364-351-9
- Il Settecento Liutario Bolognese, Scuola Popolare di Musica di Testaccio, Rome, 1989, 25 Feb. (lecture)
- "In Focus – Ansaldo Poggi (1933)" in The Strad magazine, January 2020, pp. 61–63
- "In Focus – Ansaldo Poggi violin of 1953. Roberto Regazzi looks at a fine violin made for the Italian soloist Uto Ughi" in The Strad magazine, September 1994, p. 892
- La Liuteria in Emilia e Romagna dalle origini ai giorni nostri, Rimini 2002. Idealibri.
- "L'influenza di Giuseppe Fiorini e di suo padre sulla Liuteria Bolognese moderna", in Disciplinare La Liuteria degli archi nella tradizione bolognese, https://assets.culturabologna.it/ce6cac64-dff0-4342-ba3c-8873ba6d2649-disciplinare-la-liuteria-degli-archi-nella-tradizione-bolognese.pdf
- Lutherie in Bologna: Roots & Success, Roberto Regazzi with Sandro Pasqual, Bologna, Florenus Edizioni, 1998
- "Musical Instruments' Acoustics as seen from a violin maker's point of view through the ages", in: ICA 17th International Congress on Acoustics – Rome 2–7 September 2001, Rome 2001
- Mozart a Bologna (2016), a movie by Graziano Cernoia, 2016

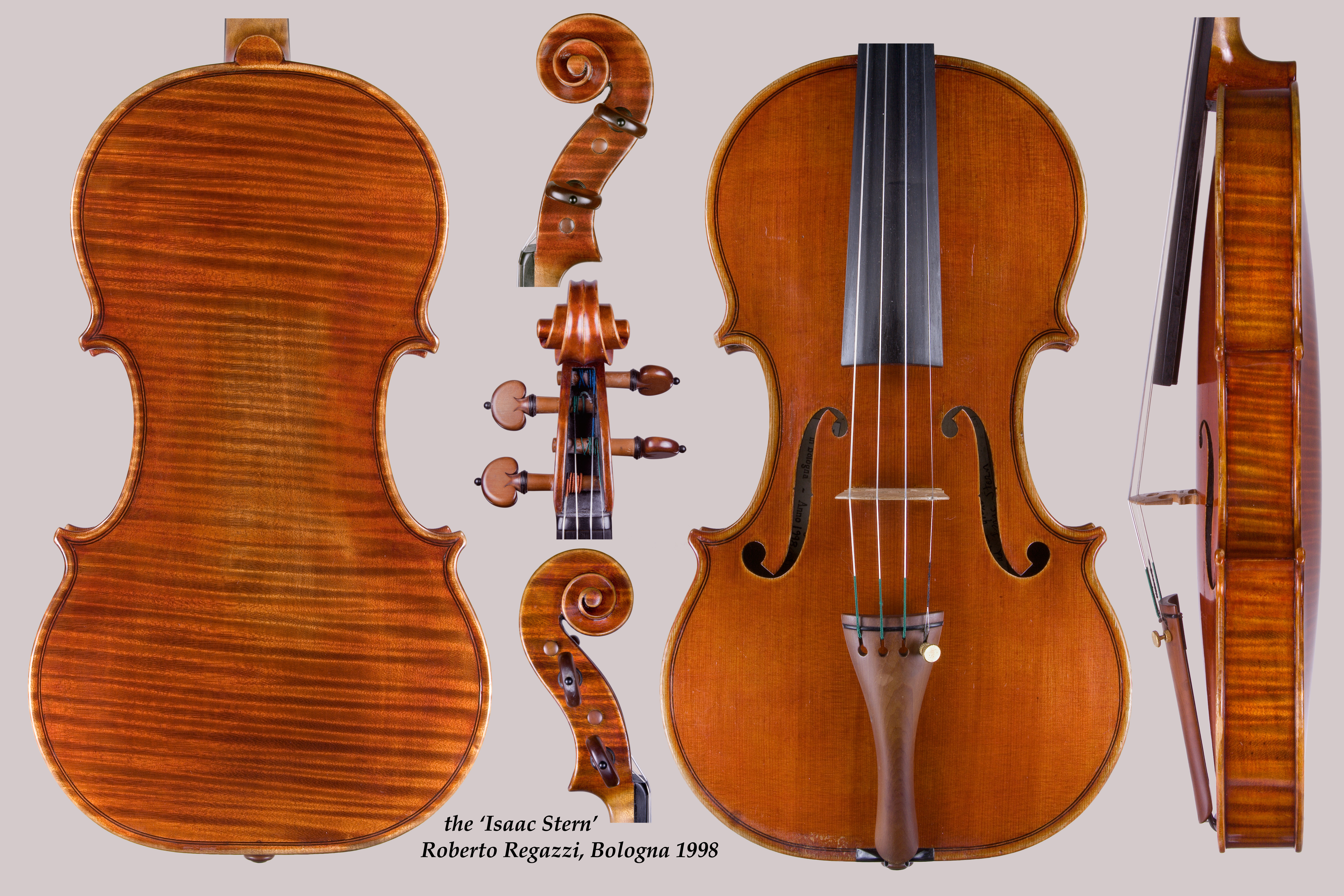
Isaac Stern Regazzi 1998

- "Oddone, Carlo Giuseppe" in Dizionario Biografico degli Italiani – Volume 79 (2013)
- Otello Bignami Cent'anni – Centenary 1914–2014, Bologna 2014, CNA Celebration Committee
- Otello Bignami, Ricordi, 46 testimonianze nel centenario della sua nascita, Bologna, Comitato Celebrativo 2014
- Otello Bignami Liutaio in Bologna – Violinmaker in Bologna, with Wilma e William Bignami, Mariarosa Pollastri, Roberto Regazzi, Bruno Stefanini, Loretta Ghelfi and Paola Malaguti, Cremona and Bologna 1998 (Turris), 2005, ISBN 88-7929-160-2
- "Otello Bignami", in Cozio Carteggio, Tarisio 7 December 2016: https://tarisio.com/cozio-archive/cozio-carteggio/otello-bignami
- "Poggi, Ansaldo", by Jaak Liivoja-Lorius and Roberto Regazzi in New Grove – Grove Music Online, Oxford Music Online: https://www.oxfordmusiconline.com/grovemusic/view/10.1093/gmo/9781561592630.001.0001/omo-9781561592630-e-0000044326 – https://doi.org/10.1093/gmo/9781561592630.article.44326
- "Pollastri, Augusto" in Dizionario Biografico degli Italiani – Volume 84 (2015)
- Raffaele and Giuseppe Fiorini, part 1, by Dmitry Gindin and Roberto Regazzi, 4 December 2018: https://web.archive.org/web/20210926071616/https://tarisio.com/cozio-archive/cozio-carteggio/fiorinis-part-1
- Raffaele and Giuseppe Fiorini, part 2, by Dmitry Gindin and Roberto Regazzi, 12 December 2018: https://web.archive.org/web/20181212081606/https://tarisio.com/cozio-archive/cozio-carteggio/fiorinis-part-2
- "Spirit of Diversity" in The Strad magazine, September 2014, pp. 63–66
- "The man who bought Stradivari's workshop" in The Strad magazine, September 2011, pp. 79–86
- "The pupils of the workshop" in Otello Bignami Cent'anni – Centenary 1914–2014, Bologna, Comitato Celebrativo, 2014
- The Magic of Wood, interviewed by Linda Johnston, with a.o.Rudolf Koelman, Salvatore Greco, Joaquín Palomares, etc.. Genova, Dynamic 2005, edited also with a Japanese translation. ASIN B000BUEGJA
- The Sound of Bologna, Bolognese Violin Making between the 1800s and 1900s – Events dedicated to Raffaele Fiorini and the Violin Making Tradition of the City. Bologna, Florenus 1991 Bologna, 7–22 December 2002, Art and History Collections of Fondazione Carisbo in Bologna San Giorgio in Poggiale, with William Bignami, Gabriele Carletti, Alberto Giordano, Giancarlo Guicciardi, Sandro Pasqual, Mariarosa Pollastri, Roberto Regazzi, Duane Rosengard, Pietro Trimboli and Alessandro Urso
- "The situation of violin making in Bologna in the 18th century" in Fourth Tiverton Violin Conference, East Devon College 1989, ISBN 1-85522-062-8
- "The Tononi family" in The Cozio Carteggio, Tarisio.com, March 2015
- Tecniche basate sulla conoscenza per la classificazione di oggetti complessi, un'applicazione all'analisi di violini di interesse storico, graduation thesis by Alessandro Bugatti and Adriano Ragazzi on the identification of Bignami violins. Prof. Giovanni Guida: supervisor; Piero Mussio, Ing. Pietro Baroni, Dott. Renato Meucci, Roberto Regazzi: assistant supervisors and collaborator
- Tre Secoli di Liuteria a Bologna – Mostra-Concerto a Casa Lauro in occasione del Congresso UEL 1993 / Three Centuries of Violin-making in Bologna, Unione Europea Maestri Liutai a Archettai – Union Europäischer Geigen-und Bogenbau Meister – Union Europeenne des Maîtres Luthiers at Archetiers, Bologna 1993, UEL
- Uso di pirolisi con gas cromatografia e spettrometria di massa per lo studio delle vernici usate dagli antichi liutai, graduation thesis by Emanuela Marin, Bologna University 2007. Prof. Giuseppe Chiavari: supervisor; Roberto Regazzi: assistant supervisor
- with Alberto Giordano: "Violino Giovanni Antonio Marchi – Bologna, ca. 1770" in Archi Magazine-"Grandi Strumenti", Nov.-Dec. 2021, pp. 28–34
- "Violino Marco Dobretsovich – Alessandria d'Egitto, 1928" in Archi Magazine, Nov.-Dec. 2023, pp. 54–58
- Wood-n-Soul, a movie by Alessio Gonnella, 2015 https://web.archive.org/web/20210907075552/http://cargocollective.com/alessiogonnella/Lavori/Wood-n-Soul

== Bibliography ==
- Arte Italiana per il Mondo; Centro Librario Italiano. Torino 1986; vol XI, pp. 7768–7769.
- Catalogo dell'Artigianato in Italia, Milano, 1984, Giorgio Mondadori
- Chitarra: storia, miti, immagini – Bologna, 4–15 aprile 1987 – Sala Ercole in Palazzo d'Accursio, Bologna, 1987, AICS
- Drescher Thomas; Die Geigen und Lautenmacher vom Mittelalter bis zur Gegenwart; Schneider, Tutzing 1990; p. 502.
- Gabriella Gallerani, "Liuteria. Arte e passione. Intervista a un giovane liutaio nella sua bottega" in La chitarra, storia mito e immagini, Milano, 1987, Fabbri, pp. 58–64
- Gioli, Sergio, "Un amore di violino" in Il Resto del Carlino, 6 October 1990
- Heimsoeth, Bettina, "Europäischer Zusammen-Klang" (Handwerk und Europa) in Kammer Aktuell, Zeitung der Handwerskammer Düsseldorf, 19. August 1999, nummer 16, p. 15 (interview to Regazzi)
- Gruppo Liutai e Archettai Professionisti; ALI, Associazione Liutaria Italiana. Cremona 1994, pp. 76–77
- Guida all'Artigianato Artistico nella Provincia di Bologna, Bologna, 1990
- Il suono di Bologna oggi. Gruppo Liuteria Bolognese, Bologna 2003, GLB, p. 28–29.
- Secondo Concorso Nazionale di Liuteria Città di Pisogne, catalogo Aug. 2008
- Monica Mascheroni, L'Artigianato Italiano – Ferro battuto, legno intagliato, vetri piombati, terracotta, maiolica, mosaico, pizzi, merletti, strumenti musicali, Milano 1986, Mondadori
- Silvia Montevecchi, Realizzare i sogni. Storie di donne e uomini felici, with a preface by Patrizio Roversi. Unicopli, Milano, 2002. Ref. pp. 73–83: Roberto Regazzi's intimate bio. ISBN 88-400-0771-7
- Nicolini Gualtiero, Violinmakers in Italy – From the 19th century to the present, Ozzano dell'Emilia, 2008
- Nicolini Gualtiero, Liutai italiani di ieri e di oggi, Cremona, 1991
- Christobel Kent, "Craft, science, magic" in Bologna For Connoisseurs magazine, 2013, #4 Autumn, pp. 40–47: an interview with Roberto Regazzi. ISSN 2239-706X
- Il Legno Magico; Bologna-Genova 2005, Florenus & Dynamic: an interview by Linda Johnston. ISBN 88-85250-07-6
- Nicolò Corsini, "Creare e Ricreare: Intervista a Roberto Regazzi, Mº Liutaio", in Liuteria Elettronica e nuovi gesti sonori: il caso delle Ondes Martenot

== Discography ==
- Eleonora Turtur [violin] with Sara Costa [piano]: Bohemian stories, Digressione Music 2023, ASIN B0D2S8T4WW
- Anastasiya Petryshak: Ange Terrible, with Lorenzo Meo (piano), Sony Music Bmg Europe 2023 ASIN B0BS5C4CBK
- Peter Fisher [violin, conductor], with Chamber Ensemble of London: Eclogue, British Chamber Music, SOMM Recordings 2022, SOMMCD0653 ASIN B09WPVGVZ5
- Jonathan Mesonero [solo violin]: Trascendo, IBS Classical 2020, IBS152020 ASIN B08PNSM4SD
- Eleonora Turtur [violin] with Angelo Arciglione [piano]: Mario Castelnuovo-Tedesco: Exotica (World Premiere Recording), Digressione Music 2018, ASIN B0D327TBNF
- Peter Fisher [violin], with Margaret Fingerhut [piano]: Malcolm Arnold, Centenary Celebration, SOMM Recordings 2021, SOMMCD0640 ASIN B09BL99JTT
- Emanuele Giacopelli, 2 trios for violin, cello and piano – 2 trios for flute, violin and cello (Trio Siciliano, violin: Silviu Dima), Udamaris 2007: UME CD011
- Carl Michael Bellman: Bellman á Íslandi, JAPIS, Reykjavik 1996, ISBN 9979-9269-0-2 –
- Ludwig van Beethoven, Johannes Brahms, Beethoven-Brahms, Musicarte 2007
- Antonio Vivaldi: Violin concertos, Op. 4, "La Stravaganza" 1–6, Tactus 1996 ASIN B000024MS4
- Antonio Vivaldi: Violin concertos, Op. 4, "La Stravaganza" 7–12, Tactus 1996 ASIN B000024MS5
- Antonio Vivaldi: Trio Sonata for 2 Violins and Basso Continuo, Op. 1, 1–6, Tactus 1996 ASIN B000024MSL
- Antonio Vivaldi: Trio Sonata for 2 Violins and Basso Continuo, Op. 1, 7–12, Tactus 1996 ASIN B000024MSM
- Gian Francesco Malipiero, Complete String Quartets, 2 CDs, Dynamic 1996 ASIN B0000044K6
- Ottorino Respighi – Giuseppe Martucci, Piano Quintets, Ermitage 1993 ASIN B000026TI9
- The Magic of Wood, Dynamic & Florenus 2005, with Rudolf Koelman, Salvatore Greco, Alberto Martini, etc., ISBN 88-85250-07-6 ASIN B000BUEGJA
- Ottorino Respighi, Piano Quintets, with Patrizia Prati, Aura 1995: AUR 416-2 ASIN B000009JT7
- Antonio Bazzini, Sämtliche Streichquartette, 3 CDs, Dynamic 2002: CDT 418 ASIN B00006L70O
- Giuseppe Verdi, Giacomo Puccini, Riccardo Zandonai, Streichquartette, Dynamic 2004 ASIN B0006DTZWK
- Box-Set Quartetti Italiani Von Boccherini Bis Malipiero, 10 CDs, Dynamic CDS486 2005 ASIN B000CNEFXI
- Antonio Vivaldi, Violinkonzerte, 1996 ASIN B000024MS8
- Ludwig van Beethoven, Sämtliche Streichquintette, 2 CDs, Dynamic 2006: CDS484 ASIN B000FIKVZG
- Henry Purcell, Ciaccona, Gliarchiensemble CD, GAE 2008: ASIN B0040E6OI4
- Alberto Martini, Mark Van Aken, Roberto Loreggian, Bicentenaire De L'étude Des Notaires Dierckx Turnhout, Sonate, PRDSM2-02 2002
- Antonio Vivaldi, (Sonaten), Tactus ASIN B000024MS6
- Ottorino Respighi, Il Tramonto, Koch International 3-7215-2
- Charlie Chaplin, Dmitri Schostakovich, Sergej Rachmaninoff, Fun Time, Dynamic 1996: CDS195 ASIN B00007GXO0
- Gian Francesco Malipiero, Luigi Dallapiccola, Hans Krása, Karl Amadeus Hartmann, Isolamenti [1938–1945]/Concert No.1, Fonit Cetra 1997: NFCD 2033 ASIN B000005SID
- Antonio Vivaldi, Le Dodici Opere a Stampa (Violinkonzerte), Tactus 1996 ASIN B000024MS7 –
- Antonio Vivaldi, 12 Opere a Stampa (Sonaten), Tactus ASIN B0000249QL
- Didier Large, Double Face, DL-Media7 1989
- Antonio Vivaldi, Konzerte für Streicher und Basso continuo, Naxos 1997 ASIN B0000014F1
- Giovanni Battista Viotti, Concerto No. 23; Sinfonie concertanti Nos. 1 & 2 (Aldo Sisillo), Naxos 1998 ASIN B0000060CX
- Antonio Vivaldi, Opera 7 – Libro Primo (Concerti 1–6), Tactus 2000 ASIN B00003Q001
- Antonio Vivaldi, Concerto for violin & strings in Bf; Concerto for violin & strings in Dm, Tactus 1996 ASIN B000004581
- Antonio Vivaldi, Flute Concertos Op. 10 with Marzio Conti, L'Offerta musicale di Venezia, Nuova Era 1994: 7192 ASIN B00005YIPT
- Claude Debussy, Maurice Ravel, Akio Yashiro, Akira Miyoshi, Chikashi Tanaka and Kazuoki Fujii, Camerata 2001: 28CM-612 ASIN B00005QCDL
- Domenico Scarlatti, Joaquín Rodrigo, Jutta Wenzlaff and Thomas Bittermann, Sound Star-Ton 1992 ASIN B0000289GG
- Nino Rota, La Strada, The Leopard, etc., conducted by Marzio Conti, Chandos 2003 ASIN B00009V908
- Orquestra Mahatma and the Solid Strings, Nightingale of a Thousand Joys, Villagelife 1999 ASIN B00001ZTZ4
- Iames Santi, 1999
- Giuseppe Martucci, Klavierquintett Op. 45, Aura 2002 ASIN B00007FP88
- Sonia Slany and the Solid Strings, Bubbling Under, Villagelife 2000 ASIN B00004S29P
- Cantos Yoruba de Cuba, KLE 2003
- I Concerti: Solo, Duo, Trio 2003
- Sonia Slany, Monochord Music, Villagelife
- Sonia Slany, Meeting Electra, Villagelife 1997 ASIN B00002MS0O
- Orquestra Mahatma, Live Stay Cool, Babel 2005: BDV 2557 ASIN B000BUYTME
- Luigi Boccherini, String Quartets Vol.1, Dynamic 1995: CDS 111 ASIN B00008EZN1
- Luigi Boccherini, String Quartets Vol.2, Dynamic 1995: CDS 127 ASIN B0009DTEQY
- Luigi Boccherini, String Quartets Vol.3, Dynamic 1996 CDS 154 ASIN B00002642G
- Didier Large, Jazz Guitar Solo, Adda ETM 1991
- Ludwig van Beethoven, Quartets Op. 18 n.3 & Op. 59 n.3 'Rasumovsky', UNICEF – DC U33 / CD33 –
- Camille Saint-Saëns, Streichquartette, Dynamic 1997: CDS 179 ASIN B000027CTG
- Ottorino Respighi, "Quartetto Dorico" & Quartet in D minor, Dynamic 2001 ASIN B000059TBW
- Ruggiero Ricci, The Legacy of Cremona, Dynamic 2001: CDS373 ASIN B00005TNDL
- Ludwig van Beethoven, Ástor Piazzolla, Un incontro con Dora, Aikoros 2000
- Gabriel Fauré, Cuartetos con Piano, Dahiz 1999: 8-431374-000136
- Hans Krása, Gideon Klein, Viktor Ullmann, Pavel Haas, Karl Amadeus Hartmann, Forbidden, Not Forgotten: Suppressed Music from 1938–1945 (BOX SET 3 CDs), Homage 1995: 7001892 ASIN B00004TE1H
