= Anastasiya Petryshak =

Ukrainian violinist

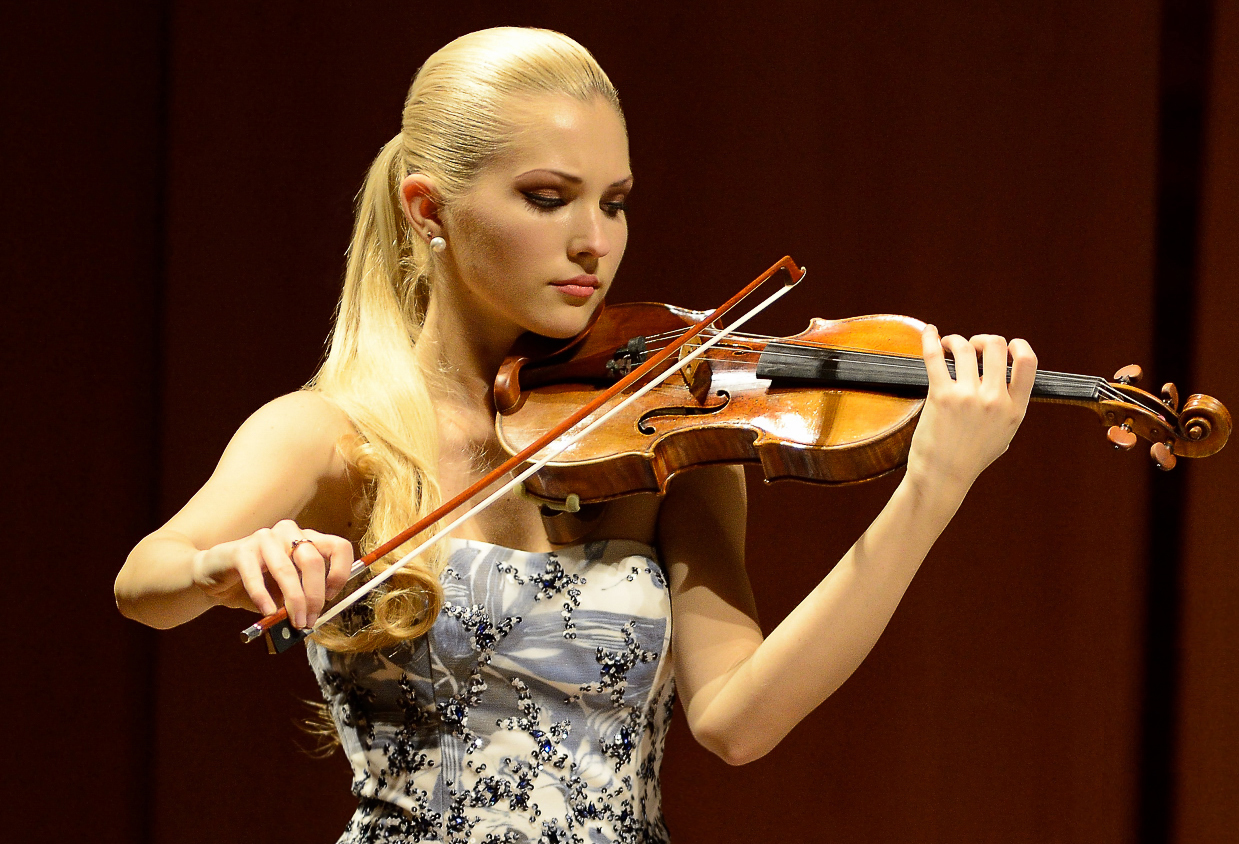
- Anastasiya Petryshak during a concert in June 2015 in the Sala Santa Cecilia in Rome, with a violin by Antonio Stradivari from 1715, "Il Cremonese".

Background information
- Born: 12 April 1994 (age 31); Ivano-Frankivsk, Ukraine
- Genres: Classical
- Instruments: Violin
- Albums: Amato Bene

Anastasiya Petryshak (Ukrainian: Анастасія Петришак; born 12 April 1994) is a Ukrainian violinist.

== Biography ==
=== Musical education ===
She was introduced to music with piano studies at age 5; in the following years, she began studying the violin. Even in the early years, she began to perform publicly as a soloist, participating in and winning numerous national and international competitions. Her great talent and determination, demonstrated in Ukraine, led her to move to Italy when she was 10, to continue her violin studies. At age 15, she was admitted to the Walter Stauffer International Academy of Cremona, for Advanced Specialization in Violin, and then the Accademia Musicale Chigiana in Siena, where she was trained by Master Salvatore Accardo.

At age 17, she graduated from the Arrigo Boito Conservatory in Parma with the highest marks, honors and an honorable mention. She then received a specialization diploma for violin from the International Piano Academy "Incontri col Maestro" in Imola. At the beginning of 2015 she concluded a two-year program in advanced specialization with the highest marks, honors and an honorable mention at the Claudio Monteverdi Musical Institute of Cremona with Laura Gorna, thus completing the maximum of available studies in Italy for the violin. She also studied with Zakhar Bron, Boris Belkin, Shlomo Mintz, Pierre Amoyal and others. In 2017, she began to further improve her violin technique with Professor Rudolf Koelman, at the Zürcher Hochschule der Künste.

=== Career ===
She began a solo career in Ukraine by performing in numerous solo concerts with orchestra, by composers such as Bach, Vivaldi, and Accolay. Even in the early years, she emerged as the absolute winner in numerous competitions. She made her debut as a soloist in Italy at age 15, performing the Violin Concerto No. 1 by Paganini with the "Arturo Toscanini" Philharmonic Orchestra of Parma, with which she also performed, in the months following, the Violin Concerto by Tchaikovsky at the Paganini Auditorium, thus launching a solo career that led her to perform in numerous major theaters. In 2012 she won the competition of "Best Graduates from Conservatories and Musical Institutes of Italy, 2011" and in 2014 she was among the best students from the Institutes of Advanced Music Education in Italy.

She has performed and collaborated with international musicians such as Sofia Gubaidulina, Salvatore Accardo, Rocco Filippini, Gianluigi Gelmetti, Federico Longo and many others. Since the age of 15 she has worked with Andrea Bocelli, who has invited her as a guest soloist for numerous concerts in Italy and abroad.

Particularly sensitive to social issues, she offers her music at charity events such as benefits following the earthquake in Haiti or to help build the new Cardiac Surgery ICU at the Bambino Gesù Hospital. In 2015 she was chosen to be part of the project designed and established by Pope Francis and the Pontifical Council for the Family, entitled "The Great Mystery". Each year she is dedicated to initiatives to commemorate the International Holocaust Remembrance Day, such as the show "The Question of Mozart" or by performing in concerts with the "Violin of Hope".

In 2016 she had the opportunity to play Paganini's violin “Il Cannone” (Guarneri del Gesu, 1743) in the Teatro Carlo Felice in Genova with Orchestra to honor the 234th anniversary of his birth. She played Paganini's Violin Concerto No. 1.

In 2018, she released her first CD, with the label Sony Classical, called "Amato Bene". In 2022, she released her second CD "Ange Terrible", again with Sony, focused on the French masterpieces of the first half of the twentieth century.

=== Instruments ===
She collaborates with the "Stradivari Foundation" and "Museum of the Violin" of Cremona, regularly performing with all the instruments in the collection, made by Stradivari, Antonio Amati, Guarneri del Gesù and others. She also works with the musical acoustics laboratory at the Polytechnic University of Milan and the non-invasive diagnostic laboratory of the University of Pavia, which deals with acoustic aspect of the instrument and the physical nature of the ancient violins from Cremonese violin making, as well as modern instruments, winners of the Triennial International Competition of Violin Making. These collaborations allowed her, at a young age, to specialize in the use of the antique Cremonese instruments of Stradivari, Amati, Guarneri del Gesu as well as the modern versions, performing with roughly 60 of them, studying their acoustic performance in depth and identifying the peculiarities and nuanced timbre of each violin.

Anastasiya Petryshak plays a modern violin by Bologna's violin maker Roberto Regazzi.
