= Salvatore Greco (violinist) =

Italian violinist

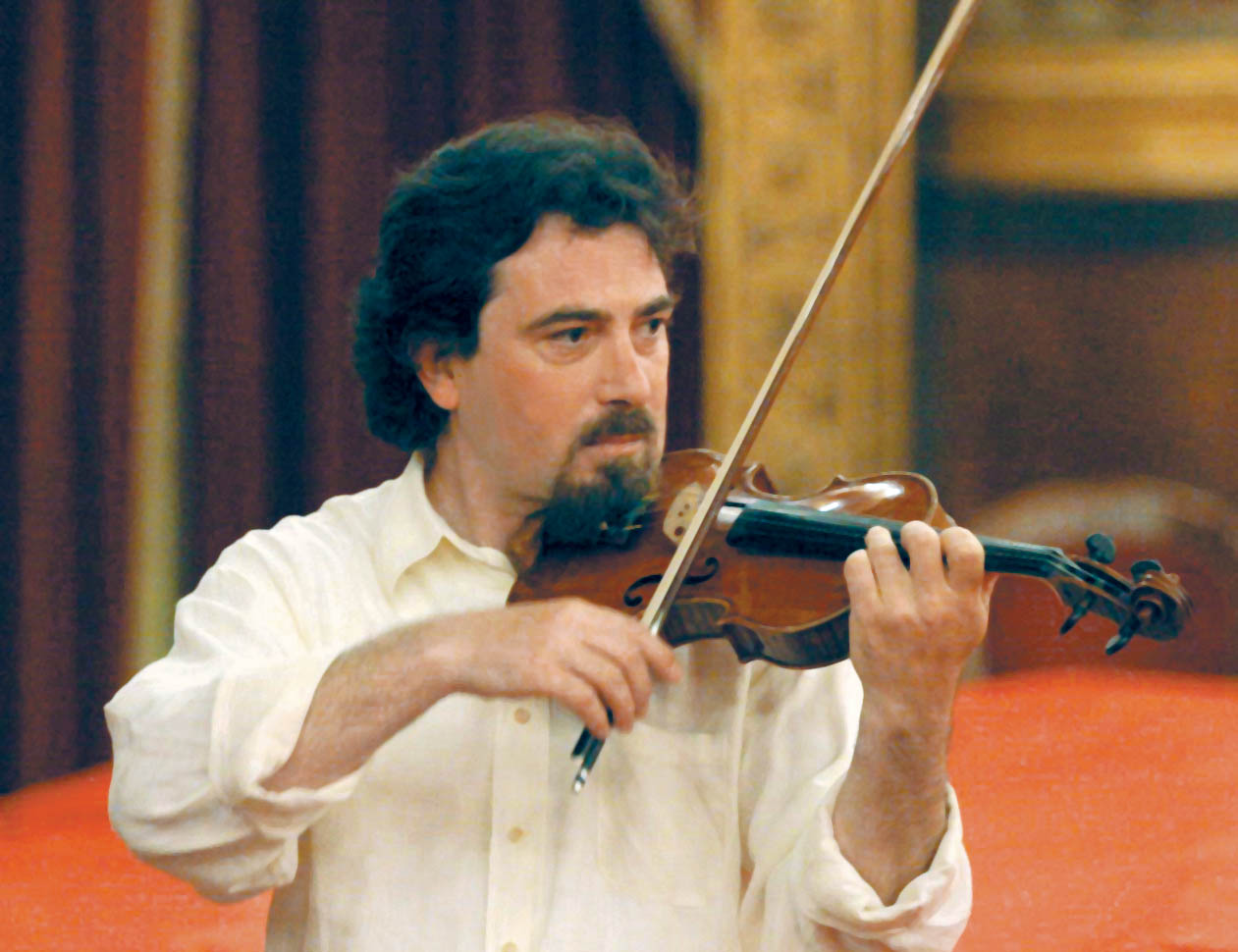
Palermo Concertmaster Salvatore Greco

Salvatore Greco (born Palermo, 1964) is an Italian violinist, leader of the Orchestra of Teatro Massimo, Palermo since 1991.

== Biography ==
He studied in London with Eugene Sarbu (1984), with Paolo Borciani (1985), and in 1985–1989 in the U.S. at the Indiana University, Bloomington, with Franco Gulli, Yuval Yaron and Rostislav Dubinsky.

== Solo career ==
His active solo career includes engagements throughout North and South America, Europe, and participation at international music festivals in Tanglewood, Freiburg, Taormina, etc. He won a number of violin competitions and has recorded for RAI and Bloomington Radio Station.

He has served as guest concertmaster with many orchestras, including OSESP Brazil (1999–2003), Teatro Comunale di Bologna, Teatro Bellini di Catania (1990), Orchestra Internazionale D'Italia, and Orchestra Sinfonica Siciliana.

Master classes conducted by Greco were held at Drew University in New Jersey (1999–2000), Maracaibo Conservatory in Venezuela (2005) and the Tchaikovsky Conservatory in Santa Severina, Italy (2013).

== Instruments ==
Formerly in the collection of Maestro Greco were a Marino Capicchioni violin and a good Giuseppe Fiorini.

He currently owns an old classical Neapolitan and a fine Roberto Regazzi, dated 1996, which he mostly loves and plays.
