= Fridolin Hamma =

German luthier (1881–1969)

- Born: 17 September 1881
- Died: 9 October 1969 (aged 88)
- Occupation: Luthier
- Children: Walter

Fridolin Hamma (17 September 1881 – 9 October 1969) was an influential German luthier from Stuttgart who authored two seminal reference books on violins:

1. Meisterwerke italienischer Geigenbaukunst (Italian Violin Masterpieces) (1st ed. 1932) OCLC 3463469
2. Meister deutscher Geigenbaukunst (German Master Violin Makers) (manuscript 1944, 1948) OCLC 720264583; Expanded edition (1961) OCLC 225270853

He was the father of Walter Hamma (1916–1988), also a German luthier.
