= Otello Bignami =

Italian luthier

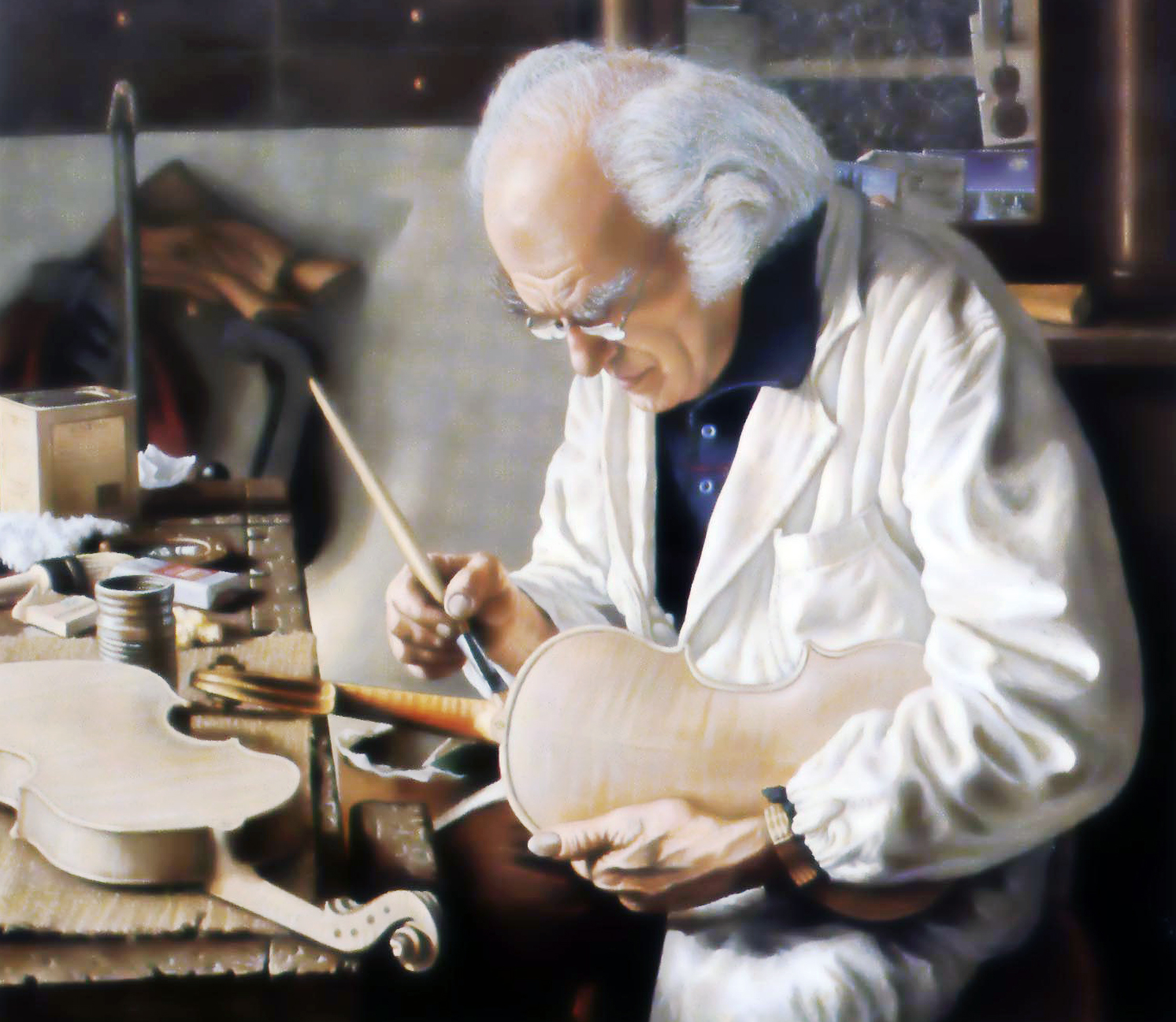
Otello Bignami portrait by Gioacchino Passini in his Bolognese atelier in 1983

Otello Bignami (August 6, 1914 – December 1, 1989) was an Italian violin maker from Bologna.

== Life ==
The life of Otello Bignami closely resembles the lives of various 19th-century violin makers in that he drew much vitality from the farming and craft traditions of his origins. He was a student of Gaetano Pollastri, and the possibility to be able to indicate on his instrument labels that he was a student of Pollastri contributed towards launching his career.

Bignami also practiced the profession of restorer of fine artwork and fine furniture, experiences which were undoubtedly valuable in preparing and composing his varnish.

He was awarded prizes at the International Exhibition of Cremona (1949), the Third National Competition of Santa Cecilia Academy of Rome (first prize, 1956), and the Wieniawski Competition in Poland ("best maker in Italy," 1957). He won first prize and Gold medal in 1967 at Bagnacavallo. In 1976 he was awarded a "gold violin" from the city of Bagnacavallo; subsequently he won a prize for his special dedication to teaching.

In the course of over forty years of incessant activity, he built a vast number of instruments in the violin family, including several quartets. His instruments are known for their beauty and acoustic qualities. Amongst his list of illustrious clients was David Oistrakh.

Bignami's role as a teacher, and subsequently director, in the violin making school instituted in Bologna during the early 1980s was decisive in ensuring the continuity of the violin making tradition in this region.

== Quotes ==
"In his rare moments dedicated to relaxation, Otello ventured into another creative art with passion and real dedication: painting. He painted landscapes, still life, and flowers with sweet and melancholic shades, usually giving them away to relations and friends. This was another vehicle for Otello's idealistic and dreamy personality which he expressed without compromise. A silent and discreet way of offering an unforgettable memory of his soul." - Liutaio in Bologna / Violinmaker in Bologna by William Bignami

== List of Pupils ==
- Pietro Trimboli (1939-)
- Curzio Rossi (1936-1977)
- Paolo Ansaloni (1948-2022)
- Franco Samoggia (1938-2005??)
- Luigi Laterrenia (1952-)
- Roberto Regazzi (1956-)
- Paola Malaguti (1957-2020)
- Felicia Pansini (1952-)
- Gianni Orsini (1938-)
- Antonello Adamo (1964-1995)
- Barbara Meyer (1959-)
- Luca Mazzetti (1960-)
- Antonello Gamberini (1961-1991)
- Vincenzo Barile (1964-)
- Alvise Cristinelli (1958-)
- Daniele Canu (1955-)
- Alessandro Urso (1963-)
- Bruno Stefanini (1960-)
- Raffaello Stefanini (1954-)
- Sergio Gregorat (1962-)
- Giuseppe Gugole (1954-)
- Giovanna Benzi (1960-)
- Federico Lippi Bruni (1957-)
- Ezia di Labio (1960-)
- Daniele Canu (1955-)
- Maurizio Spignoli (1958-2007)

== Instruments ==
In the course of over forty years of incessant activity, he built a vast number of instruments in the violin family, including several quartets (most prominent are from 1975,1976 & 1977). 1975 & 1976 were made as dedications to Gaetano Pollastri. 1977 was made as homage and dedication to Augusto Pollastri (marking the centenary celebration of Augusto's birth). Bignamis instruments are known for their beauty and acoustic qualities.

O. Bignami Viola which was part of a quartet from 1976:

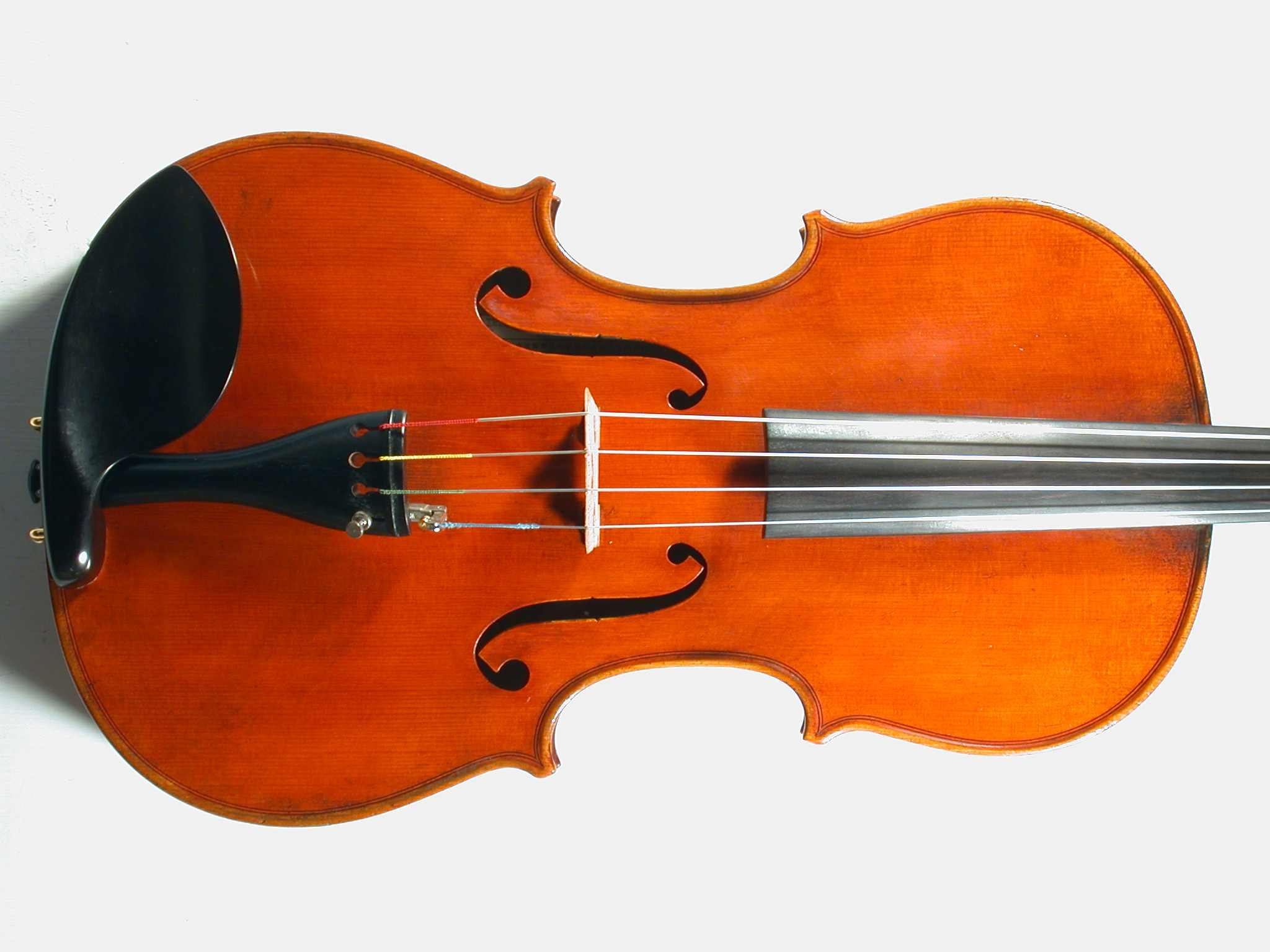
Otello Bignami Viola top Firenze1976

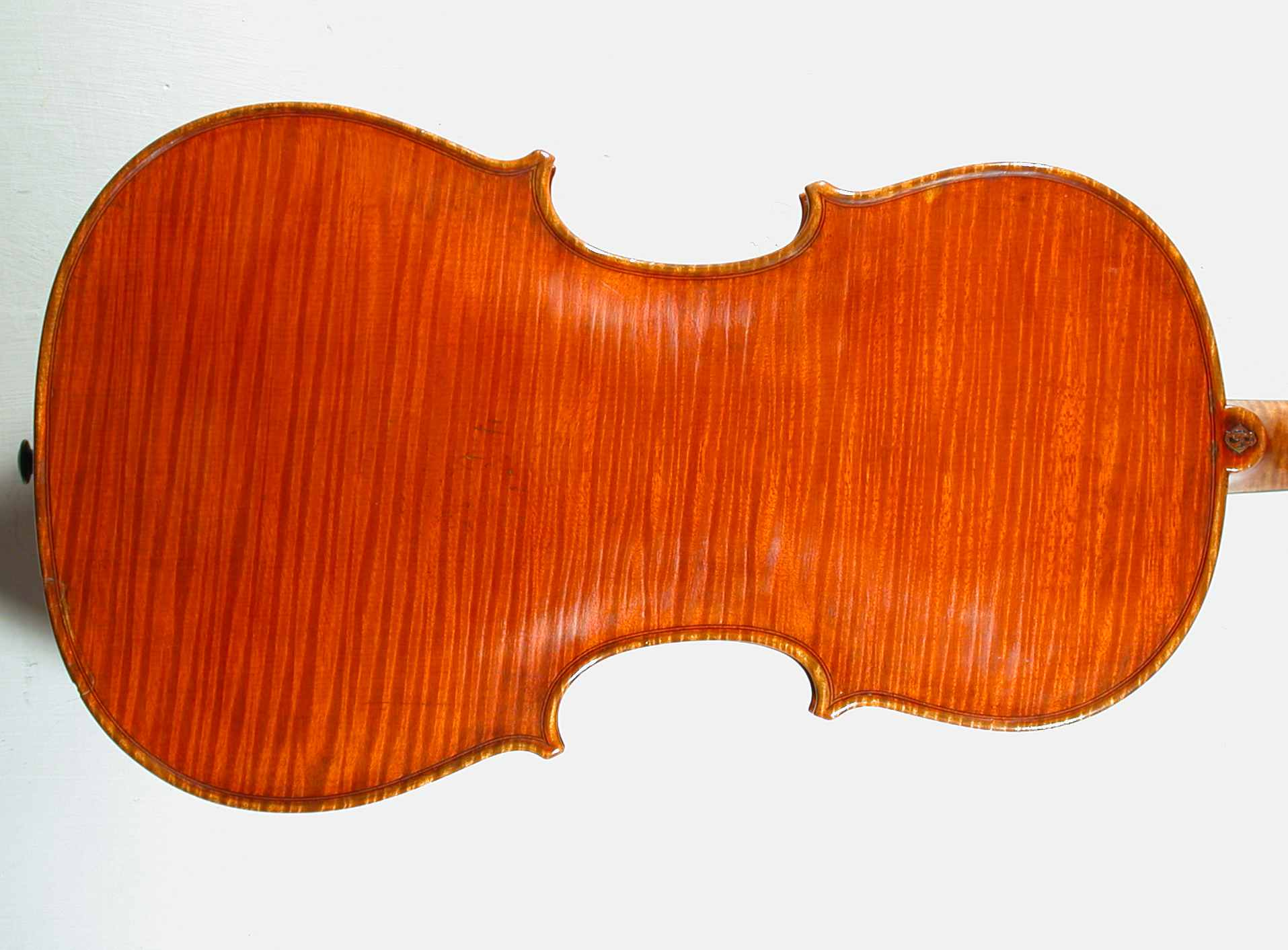
Otello Bignami Viola back Firenze 1976

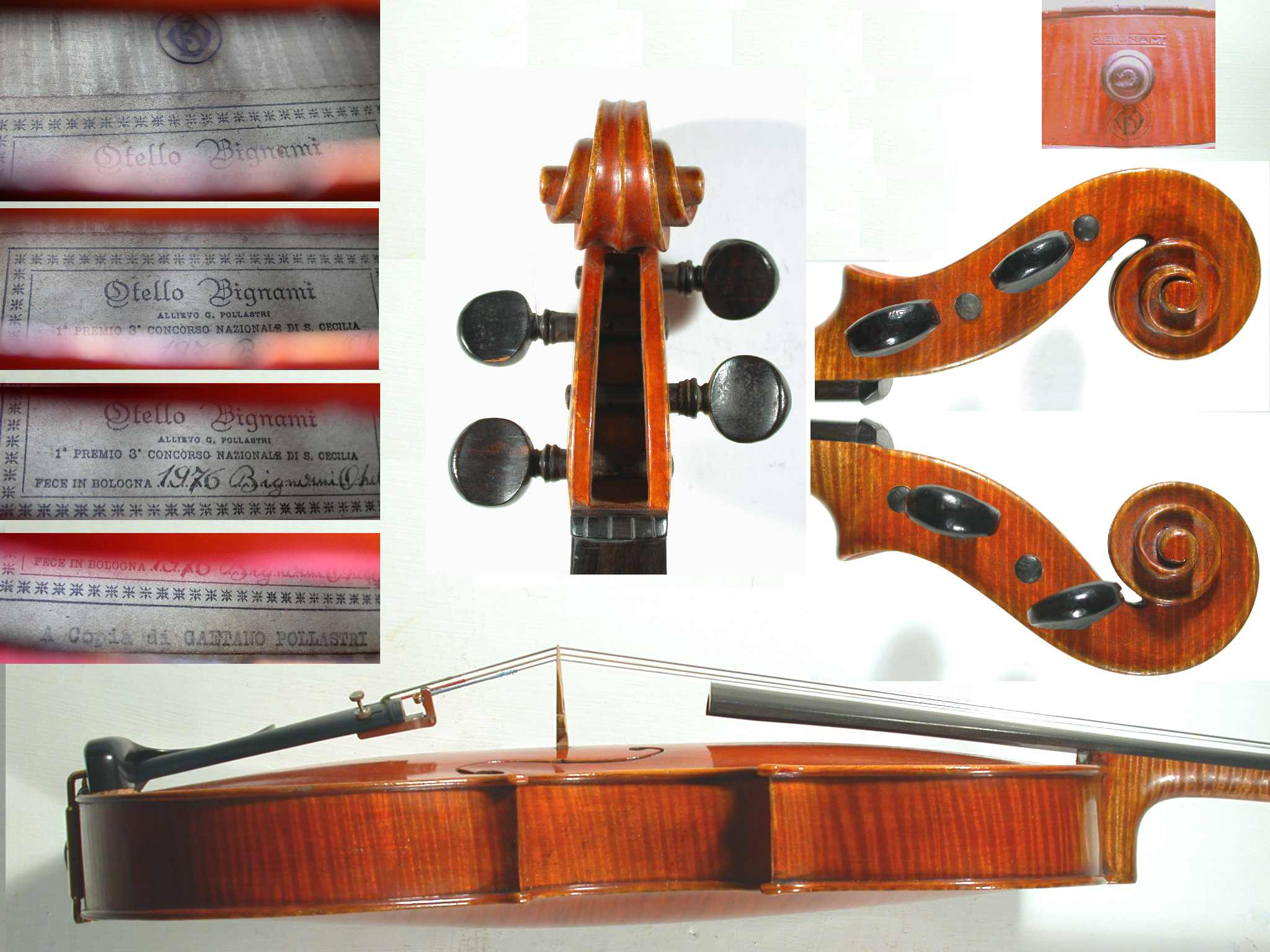
Otello Bignami Viola scroll and side Firenze1976

== Living Museum ==
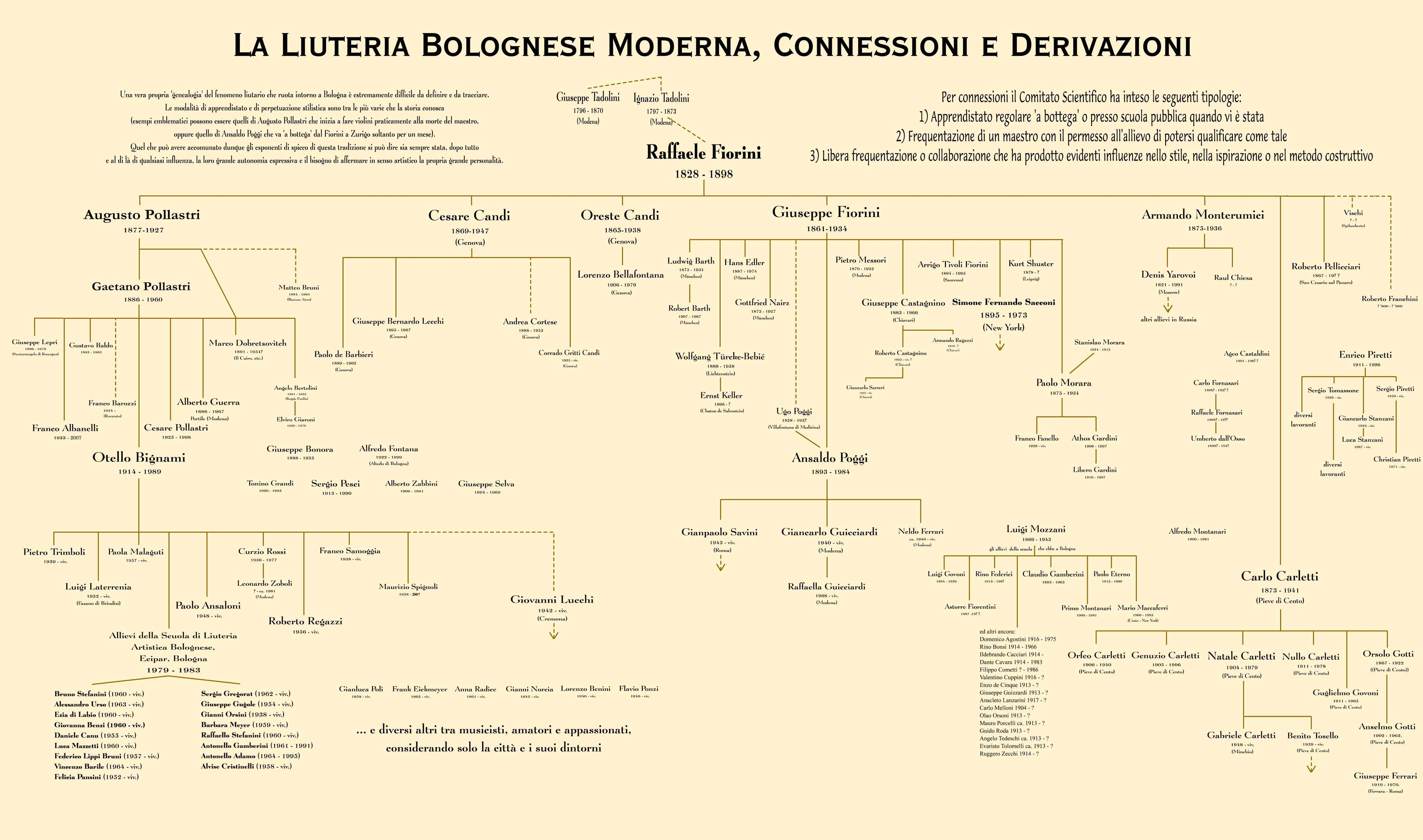
Modern Bolognese Violin-Making Table

The Bolognese school that Bignami directed is now a living museum. His workshop was carefully reconstructed and is still in use.

== Bibliography ==
- William Bignami, Otello Bignami Liutaio in Bologna - Violinmaker in Bologna, ISBN 88-7929-160-2
- Vita d'Autore - Note su Otello Bignami Liutaio in Bologna 1914-1989 - A Life of Artistry - Sketches of Otello Bignami violin maker in Bologna, contributions by Roberto Verti, Adriano Cavicchi, Roberto Regazzi, Giovanna Benzi and Tito Gotti, Bologna 1991 and 1993, ISBN 88-85250-03-3
- Il Suono di Bologna, Da Raffaele Fiorini ai grandi maestri del Novecento". Catalogo della Mostra nella chiesa di San Giorgio in Poggiale, Bologna 2002, ISBN 88-85250-06-8
- A Misura d'Uomo, Venezia 1985, ISBN 88-317-4788-6
- Paradigmi. Forme nell'Artigianato, Bologna 1988 and 1989
- Daniele Benati - Pierluigi Giordani, Stanze bolognesi - La Collezione Lauro, Bologna 1994
- Alessandro Bugatti - Adriano Ragazzi, Tecniche basate sulla conoscenza per la classificazione di oggetti complessi: un'applicazione all'analisi di violini di interesse storico, Brescia 1998
- Eric Blot, Un secolo di Liuteria Italiana 1860-1960 - A century of Italian Violin Making - Emilia e Romagna I, Cremona 1994 and 2003, ISBN 88-7929-026-6, ISBN 88-88360-05-0
- Marlin Brinser, Dictionary of 20th Century Italian Violin Makers, 1978
- The Strad, January 1984, Bologna - A living tradition of Violin Making
- Vannes, Rene (1985) [1951]. Dictionnaire Universel del Luthiers (vol.3). Bruxelles: Les Amis de la musique. OCLC 53749830.
- William, Henley (1969). Universal Dictionary of Violin & Bow Makers. Brighton; England: Amati. ISBN 0-901424-00-5.
- Chiara Tenan, Otello Bignami und die Bologneser Geigenbauschule des 20.Jahrhunderts - Diplomarbei zur Erlangung des Akademischen Grades Magistra der Künste in der Studienrichtung 'Violoncello' an der Universität für Musik und darstellende Kunst Mozarteum in Salzburg, Betreuer: Dietmar Machold, Salzburg 2001
- Walter Hamma, Meister Italienischer Geigenbaukunst, Wilhelmshaven 1993, ISBN 3-7959-0537-0
