= Rudolf Koelman =

Dutch violinist (born 1959)

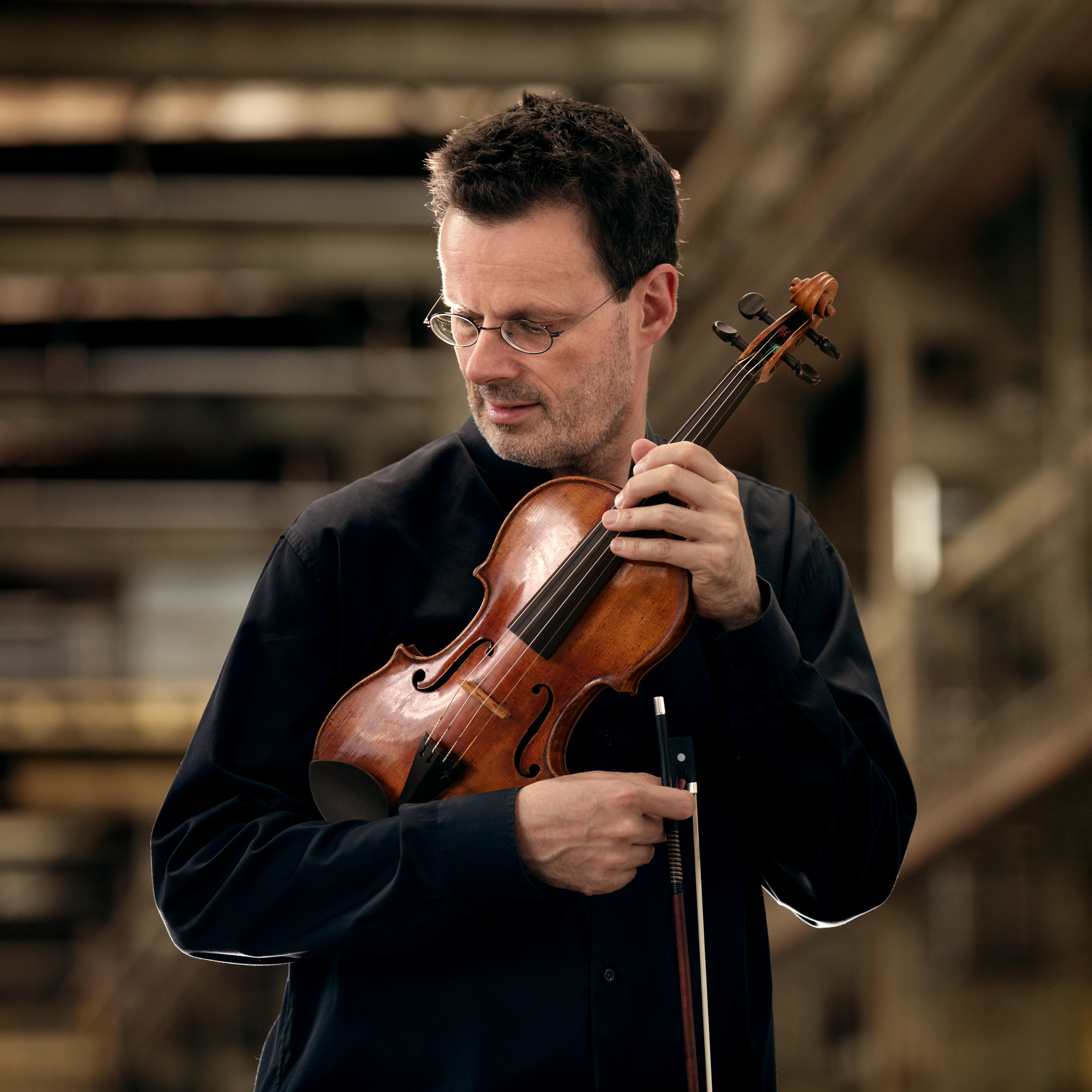
Rudolf Koelman in 2017

Rudolf Koelman (born 1959 in Amsterdam) is a Dutch violinist and is professor for violin at the Zürcher Hochschule der Künste (ZHdK) in Switzerland.

== Biography ==
Koelman studied the violin with Jan Bor and Herman Krebbers in Amsterdam. From the age of 18, he studied with Jascha Heifetz on a full scholarship at the University of Southern California School of Music, now known as the USC Thornton School of Music, in Los Angeles. From 1996 until 1999 he was first concertmaster of the Royal Concertgebouw Orchestra in Amsterdam. 2000-2005 he was Professor for violin and chamber music at the Robert Schumann Hochschule in Düsseldorf, Germany. Currently (since 1987) he is Professor for violin and chamber music at the "Zürcher Hochschule der Künste" (ZHdK) known as Zurich University of the Arts in Switzerland where he also leads the ZHdK Strings chamber orchestra. He is frequently invited as a jury member at international violin competitions and gives masterclasses all around Europe, Asia and Australia.

== Instruments ==
Koelman plays a violin made by Giovanni Francesco Pressenda in 1829 and the "Woolhouse" Stradivarius made in 1720.

== Professor ==
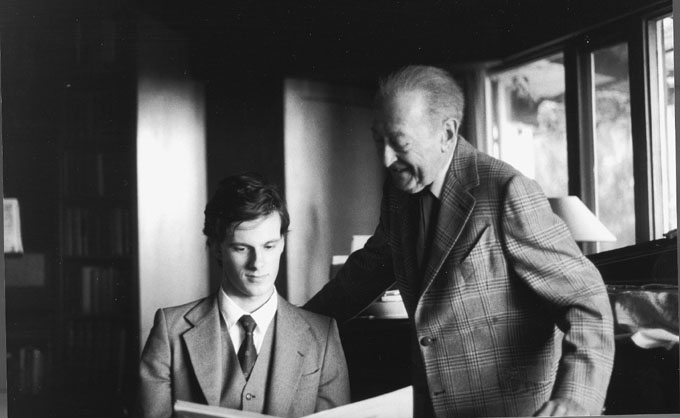
Rudolf Koelman and Jascha Heifetz (Los Angeles 1979)

- 1984–1989 Professor for Violin and chamber music at the Landeskonservatorium für Vorarlberg in Bregenz & Feldkich, Austria.
- 2000–2005 Professor for Violin and chamber music at the Robert Schumann Hochschule in Düsseldorf, Germany. (Professor title and chair for life)
- Since 1987 Professor for violin and chamber music and leader of the ZHdK Strings Orchestra at the Zurich University of the Arts in Switzerland. (Professor title and chair for life)
- Masterclasses at institutions such as: Aurora Sweden, Australian National Academy of Music in Melbourne, Griffith University in Brisbane, International Holland Music Sessions, Keshet Eilon Israel, Conservatorio Vincenzo Bellini Palermo, Perth University, Porto Carras in Greece, Silkroad Summer Sessions, Sweelinck Conservatorium Amsterdam, Sydney Conservatory, Thessaloniki Conservatory, Western Australian Academy of Performing Arts and many more.
- Online Master Teacher at iClassical Academy with whom he has recorded several online Masterclasses.

== Concertist ==
Since 1981 Rudolf Koelman has performed frequently worldwide as a soloist with a large number of renowned orchestras including Bruckner Orchester Linz, WDR Rundfunkorchester Köln, Korean Broadcasting System Symphony Orchestra, Orchestre de Chambre de Lausanne, Queensland Symphony Orchestra, Royal Concertgebouw Orchestra, Tokyo Philharmonic Orchestra.

As a soloist, concertmaster or chamber musician he shared the concert stage with musicians such as: Atar Arad, Joshua Bell, Douglas Boyd, Ronald Brautigam, Rudolf Buchbinder, Riccardo Chailly, Sir Colin Davis, Richard Dufallo, Thomas Demenga, Youri Egorov, Chiara Enderle, Dmitri Ferschtman, Liza Ferschtman, Sir John Eliot Gardiner, Nikolaus Harnoncourt, Philippe Herreweghe, Godfried Hoogeveen, Heinz Holliger, Maris Janssons, Alexander Kerr, Ulrich Koella, Ton Koopman, Hartmut Lindemann, Radu Lupu, Nikita Magaloff, Orfeo Mandozzi, Frederic Meinders, Shlomo Mintz, Viktoria Mullova, Roger Norrington, Antoine Oomen, György Pauk, Thomas Riebl, Nathaniel Rosen, Paul Rosenthal, Kurt Sanderling, Wolfgang Sawallisch, Markus Stocker, Duncan McTier, Jan Willem de Vriend, Raphael Wallfisch, Thomas Zehetmair, Frank Peter Zimmermann, Jaap van Zweden, Conrad Zwicky and many others.

== Discography ==
Rudolf Koelman has made numerous TV-, radio- and CD recordings among them a live recording of all 24 Paganini Capricci.

- J. S. Bach, Eugène Ysaÿe, Edvard Grieg: solosonatas (Grieg with Ferenc Bognàr) 1984 (LP)
- Rudolf Koelman plays his favorite encores: 16 virtuoso compositions with Ferenc Bognàr ORF, 1986 (LP-CD)
- Camille Saint-Saëns, Pablo de Sarasate: Introduction et Rondo Capriccioso, Zigeunerweisen, Musikkollegium Winterthur, 1988
- Julius Conus: Violinconcerto e-minor, with orchestra (live) Take One records, 1990
- Fritz Kreisler: 16 Masterpieces, with Ulrich Koella, Ars, 1991, ASIN B000000U2I
- Johannes Brahms: The Violin Sonatas, with Antoine Oomen, Ars, 1991, ASIN B000000U2L
- Sergei Prokofiev: 2 Sonatas, with Antoine Oomen, Ars, 1993, ASIN B000024PYF
- Johannes Brahms, Gustav Mahler, Alfred Schnittke: Piano Quartetts, Wiediscon, 1994
- Antonio Vivaldi: Le Quattro Stagioni, Ars, 1995, ASIN B000024PXU
- Niccolò Paganini: 24 Capricci, (live)Wiediscon, 1996 & Hänssler Classics, 2004, Naxos, ASIN B0009IORFM
- Jean-Marie Leclair: 6 duosonatas with Henk Rubingh, TMD 099801, 1998
- "The Magic of Wood" with 15 instruments of Roberto Regazzi, Dynamic & Florenus, 2005, ASIN B000BUEGJA
- W. A. Mozart: 2 Duos violin/viola with Conrad Zwicky Wiediscon, 2007
- Wieniawski: Violin concerto No. 2, d-minor Camille Saint-Saëns: Intr. et Rondo Capriccioso, Havanaise, Fremantle Chamber Orchestra/Jessica Gethin FCO, 2008
- Niccolò Paganini: Violin concerto's No.1 & No.2, Netherlands Symphony Orchestra/Jan Willem de Vriend Challenge Classics CC72343 Winner of Edison Award for most popular classical album in the Netherlands, 2010
- "10 years FCO" Pablo de Sarasate: Gypsy Airs, Maurice Ravel: Tzigane, Ernest Chausson: Poème Op. 25, Pyotr Ilyich Tchaikovsky: Souvenir d'un lieu cher Op. 42, Fremantle Chambre Orchestra / Jessica Gethin, Christopher van Tuinen, Rubato Productions, 2015
- Sergei Prokofiev: Violin concerto's No.1 & No.2, Musikkollegium Winterthur/Douglas Boyd, Challenge Classics CC72736, 2017
