= Bartolomeo Pollastri =

Italian mathematician and astronomer

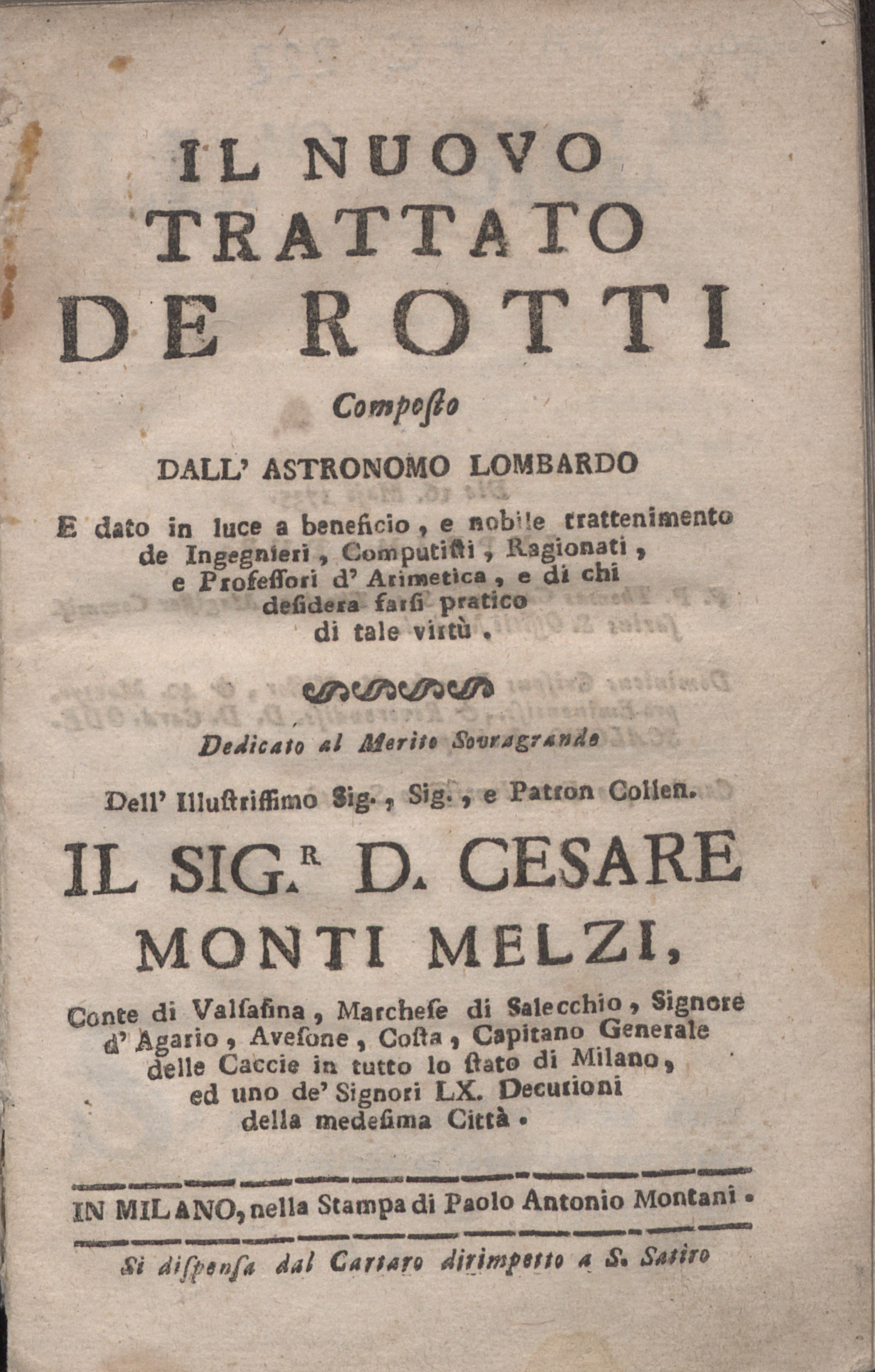
Nuovo trattato de' rotti, 1735

Bartolomeo Pollastri was an 18th-century Italian mathematician and astronomer.

== Works ==
- Nuovo trattato de' rotti (in Italian). Milan: Paolo Antonio Montano. 1735.
- Scuola di geometria pratica (in Italian). Milan: Paolo Antonio Montano. 1744.
- Proseguimento del vero modo di conteggiare all'uso mercantile moderno dalla regola del tre fino alla falsa posizione doppia (in Italian). Milan: Paolo Antonio Montano. 1781.

== See also ==
- Double-entry bookkeeping system
