= Franco Albanelli =

Italian luthier (1933–2007)

- Born: 25 August 1933; Castel San Pietro Terme, Emilia-Romagna, Italy
- Died: 1 July 2007 (aged 73); San Lazzaro di Savena Emilia-Romagna, Italy
- Occupation: Luthier

Franco Albanelli (25 August 1933 – 1 July 2007) was an Italian luthier, a pupil of Gaetano Pollastri, who was born in Castel San Pietro Terme, Emilia-Romagna, Italy.

His workmanship has always shown a clear inspiration to his teacher Pollastri style and his musical instruments are now all around the world. He made not more than 40 instruments, primarily violins, but included a few violas and violincellos.

He primarily produced instruments with a red and orange varnish.

He died in San Lazzaro di Savena, Emilia-Romagna, Italy.
