= Fondazione Arturo Toscanini =

- Abbreviation: La Toscanini
- Formation: 1994; 32 years ago
- Type: Musical institution
- Region served: Italy
- Website: www.fondazionetoscanini.it

The Fondazione Arturo Toscanini (Arturo Toscanini Foundation), based in Parma, is a musical institution of the Emilia-Romagna Region. It was established in 1994 on the initiative of Italian region Emila Romagna, the Municipality and the Province of Parma, being a natural evolution of the association of the same name established in 1975 by the Municipalities and provinces of Emilia-Romagna and recognized by the Italian State in January 1977.

== Overview ==
Today the foundation is one of Italy's largest and most dynamic musical institutions, active in symphonic and opera production, and professional training for young people in the performing arts, the Foundation bears the name of Arturo Toscanini. Its headquarters are in Parma, the Maestro's birthplace. The institution possesses today an operational scale and organizational structure that allows for the organization of an average of over 100 symphony concerts and 40 opera performances each year.

To carry out its programmes, the Foundation has two different artistic ensembles, active on an annual basis: the Arturo Toscanini Philharmonic (Italian: Filarmonica Arturo Toscanini), dedicated to the performance of the wide symphonic repertoire with the presence of the greatest international soloists and conductors; the Arturo Toscanini Emilia Romagna Orchestra (Italian: Orchestra dell'Emilia Romagna Arturo Toscanini), which is active in both regional concert activities and opera productions. On 10 May 2025 the Filarmonica Toscanini celebrated its 50th anniversary with a concert conducted by Christoph Eschenbach, held at Parma's Auditorium Paganini.

Its orchestras are guests of major regional and national theaters and tour extensively abroad. Its past opera productions, directed by directors such as Franco Zeffirelli and Pier Luigi Pizzi, have featured the most prestigious artists and have subsequently been presented in major Italian cities and abroad. The Foundation also collaborates on production with prominent Italian and international theater institutions.

It operates with the support of the Italian Ministry of Culture, which recognizes it as a national orchestral concert institution, the Emilia-Romagna Region and numerous public and private bodies.

Since 2006 it has launched the Educational project. This project creates educational music workshops in collaboration with schools in Emilia-Romagna, involving more than twenty thousand students each year.

Since July 2024 Kent Nagano is a stable collaborator of the foundation. Nagano was further appointed Principal Artistic Partner of the Foundation.
