= Walter Hamma =

Walter Hamma (22 September 1916 – 11 August 1988) was a German violin maker.

His father, Fridolin Hamma, was an influential violin maker. Walter Hamma was pupil of the violin making school in Mittenwald 1933-1935. He worked with Ferdinand Jaura in Vienna and later for Caressa & Français in Paris. During the Second World War, the workshop in Stuttgart was destroyed. After the war Fridolin and Walter Hamma built the shop up again. In 1948 Walter Hamma became a master violin maker and took over the shop in 1959. The firm of Hamma was one of the leading violin making workshops in Europe. Walter Hamma was president of the international violin making society EILA from 1963-1965. He was named as one of the leading experts for stringed instruments, and his books about Italian and German instruments are still very important books in the world of violin making. In 1982 he retired and the family business that had existed since 1864 was closed.
