= Giuseppe Fiorini =

Italian luthier (1861 - 1934)

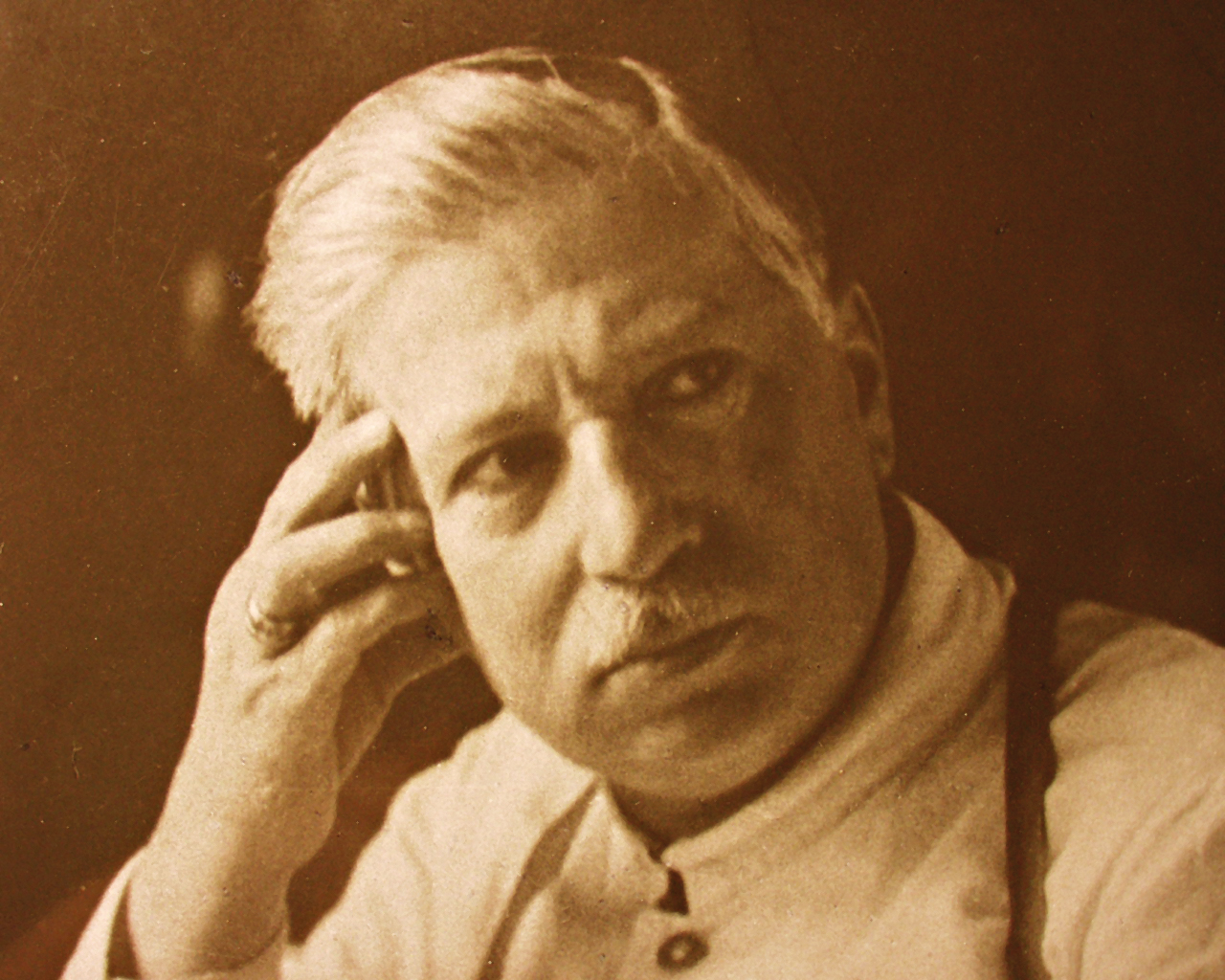
Giuseppe Fiorini in the 1920s.

Giuseppe Fiorini (1861–1934) was an Italian luthier and is considered one of the most important Italian violin makers. He established the firm Rieger and Fiorini in Munich, Germany, in 1889, then lived in Zurich during World War I and in Rome from 1923.

He donated the workshop tools, templates and drawings of Stradivarius to the City of Cremona.

== Early life and education ==
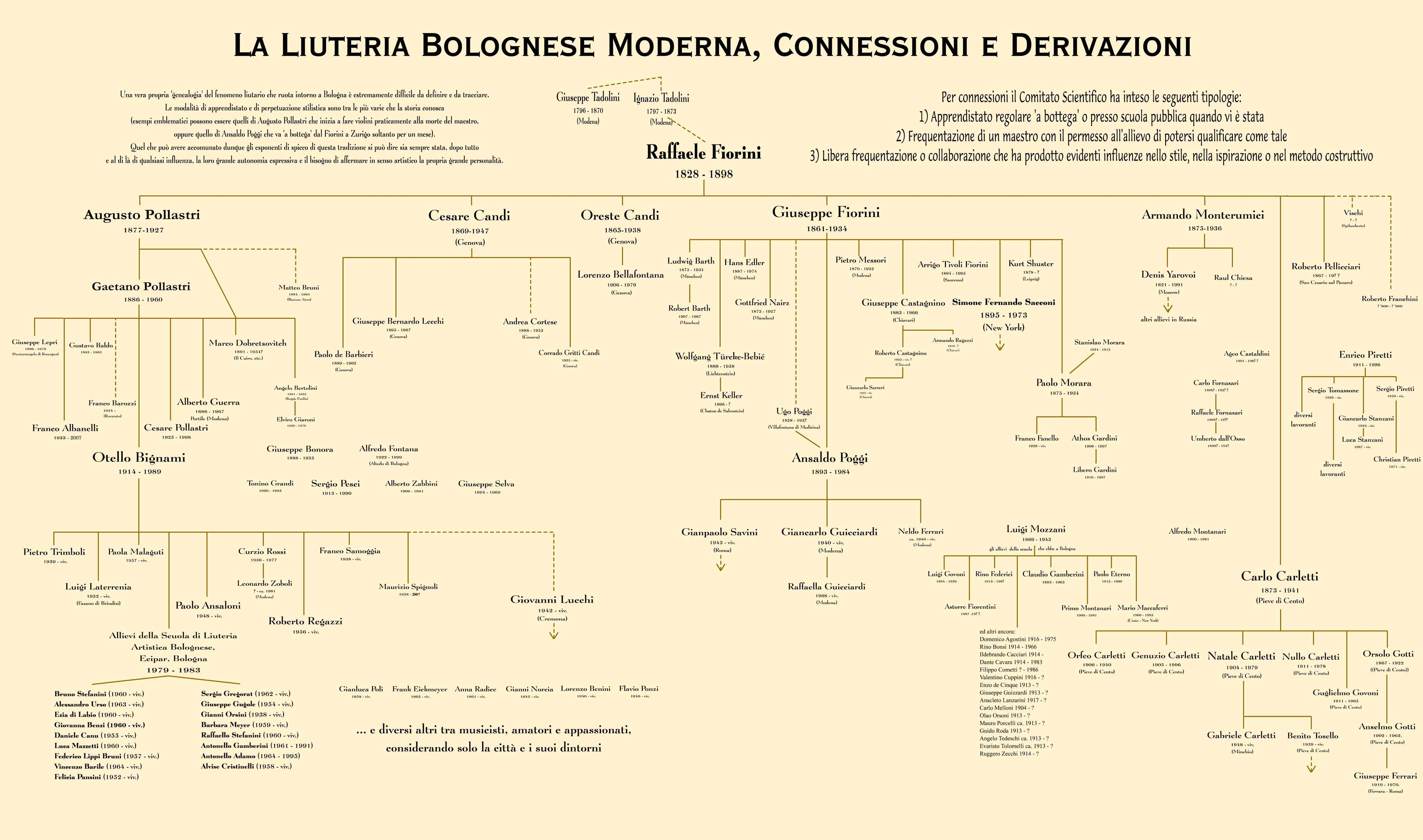
Modern Bolognese Violin-Making Table.

Fiorini was born at Bazzano, Emilia-Romagna, the son and pupil of influential violin maker - Raffaele Fiorini. He built his first instrument at the age of 16 and worked in Bologna, from 1877 to 1888.

== Career ==
=== Bologna ===
He ran his own violin studio in 'via Santo Stefano', and obtained mentions at various exhibitions. He won a prize at the Milano Exhibition of 1888, and the same year received the 'Gran medaglia d'oro' at the International Music Exhibition of Bologna.

=== Germany ===
In 1889, having married the daughter of Andreas Rieger, musical instrument maker, he moved to Munich and established the firm "Rieger and Fiorini" (1889–1914). He established himself in Germany, such that he was a founder of the German Violin-Makers' Society, and served as President for several years.

=== Switzerland ===
From 1915 until 1923 he lived and worked in Zurich,

=== Rome ===
In 1923 he settled in Rome. From 1925 his sight started to fail.

== Reputation ==
By 1926 Fiorini had built 500 violins, 10 violas, and 10 cellos in the Stradivarian style, but with the individuality not to be simple replicas. He carefully examined the violins of Stradivari, using both the original diagrams and tools.

He received medals at Exhibitions in Europe and America.

He enjoyed personal friendships with Royalty, patrons of art, and eminent virtuosi in Italy, France, Germany, and Russia, plus contributed articles to journals.

== Teaching ==
Fiorini was a leading personality of the international violin-making world, and an innovator of the technical and aesthetic aspects of the profession.

In 1920 he bought Antonio Stradivari's workshop templates, tools, original drawings and models from the Marchesa dalla Valle di Pomaro, an heir of the Count Ignazio Alessandro Cozio di Salabue. He then donated the whole collection to the City of Cremona to found a lutherie school.

Fiorini is considered one of Italy's great masters of the 20th century. He was one of the best of the violin makers in Italy at the beginning of the 20th century, and part of a renaissance of violin making in Italy which was nearly a lost art.

Among his pupils were Ansaldo Poggi, Simone Fernando Sacconi, Carlo Carletti, Paolo Morara, Wolfgang Türcke-Bebié, Giuseppe Castagnino, Pietro Messori and Arrigo Tivoli-Fiorini.

== Death ==
After bequeathing the Cozio di Salabue collection to Cremona to found its violin-making school, Fiorini returned to Munich, where he died in 1934.

== Honours ==
Fiorini was honoured with a knighthood (Cavaliere) in 1927.
