= Augusto Pollastri =

Italian luthier (1877 - 1927)

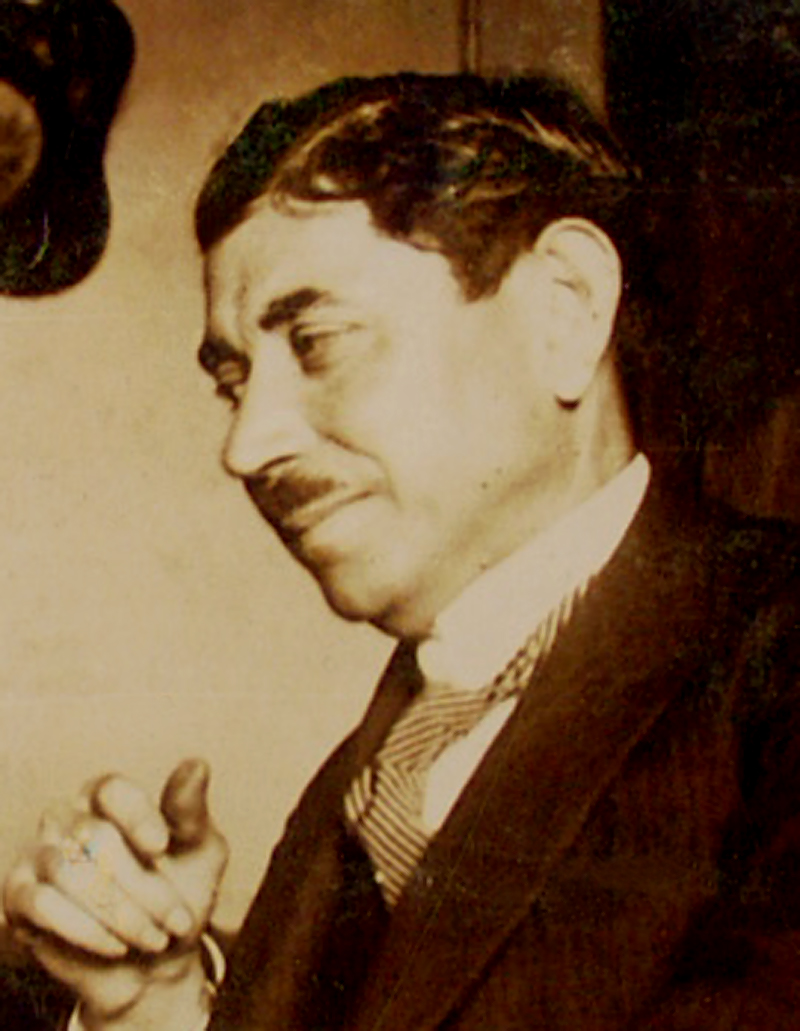
Augusto Pollastri

Augusto Pollastri (11 March 1877, in Bologna – 9 November 1927, in Bologna) was an Italian violin maker, older brother to Gaetano Pollastri. He began his career as an apprentice in Raffaele Fiorini's studio. Augusto's father was a miller and an amateur musician, which exposed him to music at an early age. He also enjoyed visiting the shop of a famous violin maker Raffaele Fiorini, where he started to perform small services in the shop, eventually leading to an apprenticeship with maestro Fiorini.

By age 20, Augusto had devoted himself entirely to the activity which had inspired him, demonstrating notable skill in violin making. Towards the end of Raffaele Fiorini's life, Augusto took over the workshop. He became known locally as a maker and restorer.

By 1927 (the year of his death), Augusto had received official recognition in his art: including the Cross of Merit and Gold Medals at the Geneva Exhibition and the United Exhibitions of the "Littriale' in Bologna."

For thirty years, he managed a violin-making workshop in Bologna. After the passing of Raffaele Fiorini, his brother Gaetano Pollastri joined him.

Pollastri’s instruments were noted for their craftsmanship, but the quantity was unfortunately not very high.

Today, Pollastri's instruments are considered legendary and among the most copied in the world aside from the Classics (Stradivari, Guarnerius etc.). "The number of fake instruments and imitations one could come across is much greater than the number of originals. "

Among his students were his brother Gaetano Pollastri and Marco Dobresovitch, and he collaborated with Carlo Carletti.

== Bibliography ==
- Augusto e Gaetano Pollastri / Bologna 1877-1960 by Cesare Magrini about the Pollastri family. Cremona 1990.
- Il Suono di Bologna, Da Raffaele Fiorini ai grandi maestri del Novecento". Catalogo della Mostra nella chiesa di San Giorgio in Poggiale, Bologna 2002, ISBN 88-85250-06-8
- Eric Blot, Un secolo di Liuteria Italiana 1860-1960 - A century of Italian Violin Making - Emilia e Romagna I, Cremona 1994 and 2003, ISBN 88-7929-026-6, ISBN 88-88360-05-0
- Marlin Brinser, Dictionary of 20th Century Italian Violin Makers, 1978
- The Strad, January 1984, Bologna - A living tradition of Violin Making
- Vannes, Rene (1985) [1951]. Dictionnaire Universel del Luthiers (vol.3). Bruxelles: Les Amis de la musique. OCLC 53749830.
- Henley, William (1969). Universal Dictionary of Violin & Bow Makers. Brighton; England: Amati. ISBN 0-901424-00-5.
- Pollastri, Mariarosa (2002). Gaetano Pollastri: una biografia. Gaetano Pollastri: a biography. San Giovanni in Persiceto; Italy: Aspasia.

== Living Museum ==
Discover the history of the Bolognese School Bolognese Violin Makers

'Up to the first half of the nineteenth century, Violin Making in Italy was in a standstill cycle; yet, during the second half of the century, Raffaele Fiorini it:Fiorini Raffaele gave new impulse to it. Thanks to him, born in Musiano di Pianoro, the luthier's ancient Art was brought back to a new life.' - History
