= Ansaldo Poggi =

Italian luthier (1893–1984)

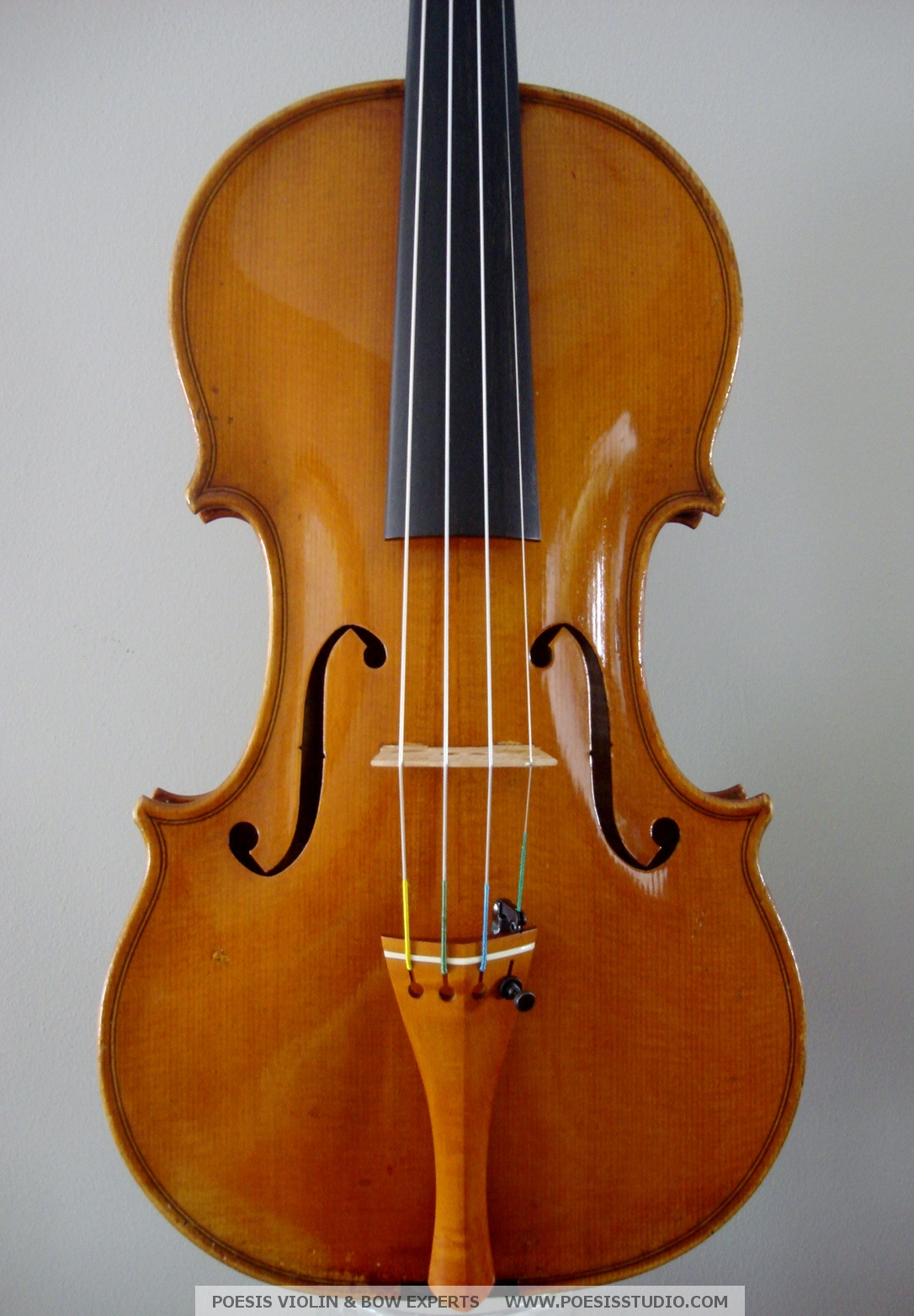
Italian Violin by Ansaldo Poggi, Bologna, Stradivari model, front

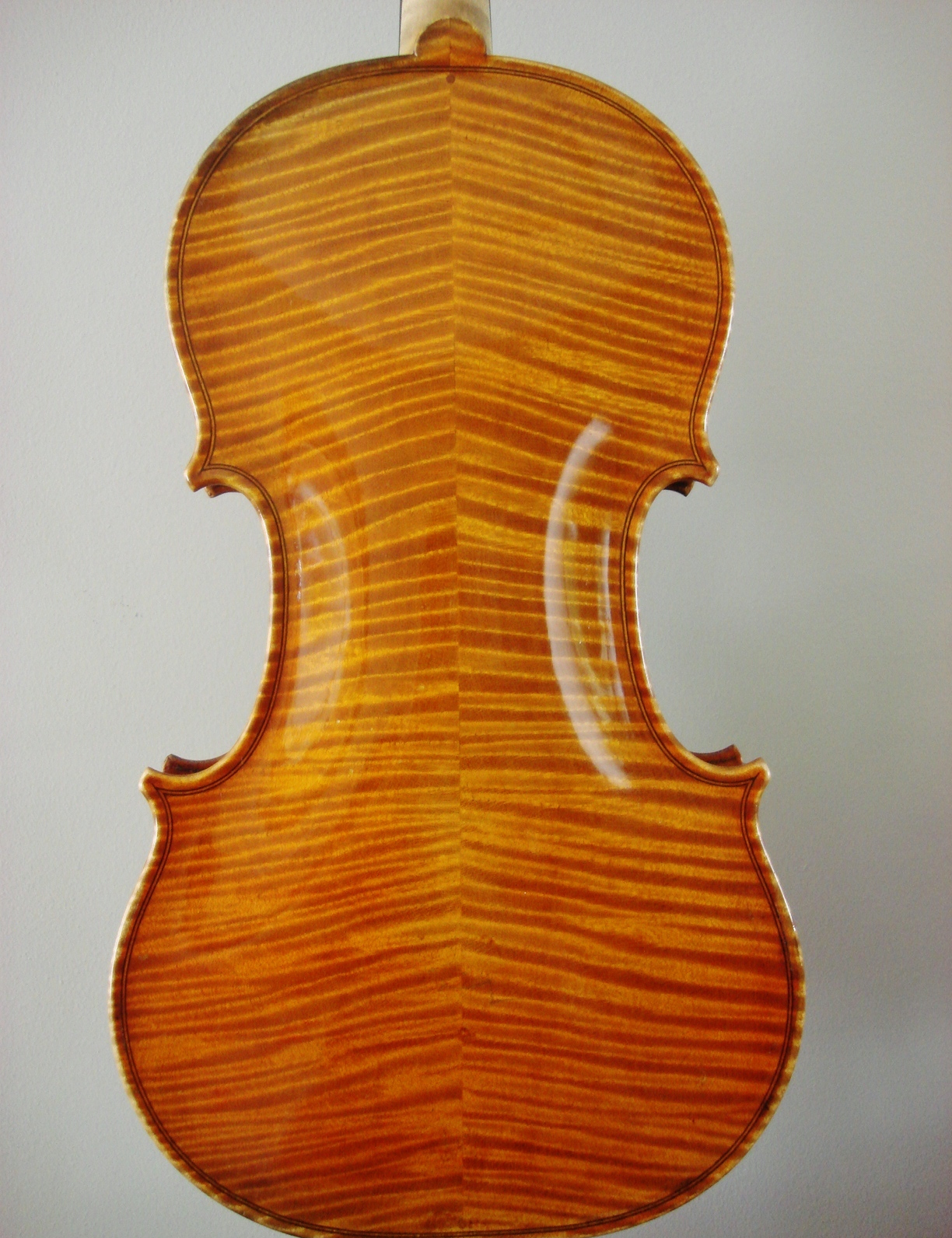
Italian Violin by Ansaldo Poggi, Bologna, Stradivari Model, Back

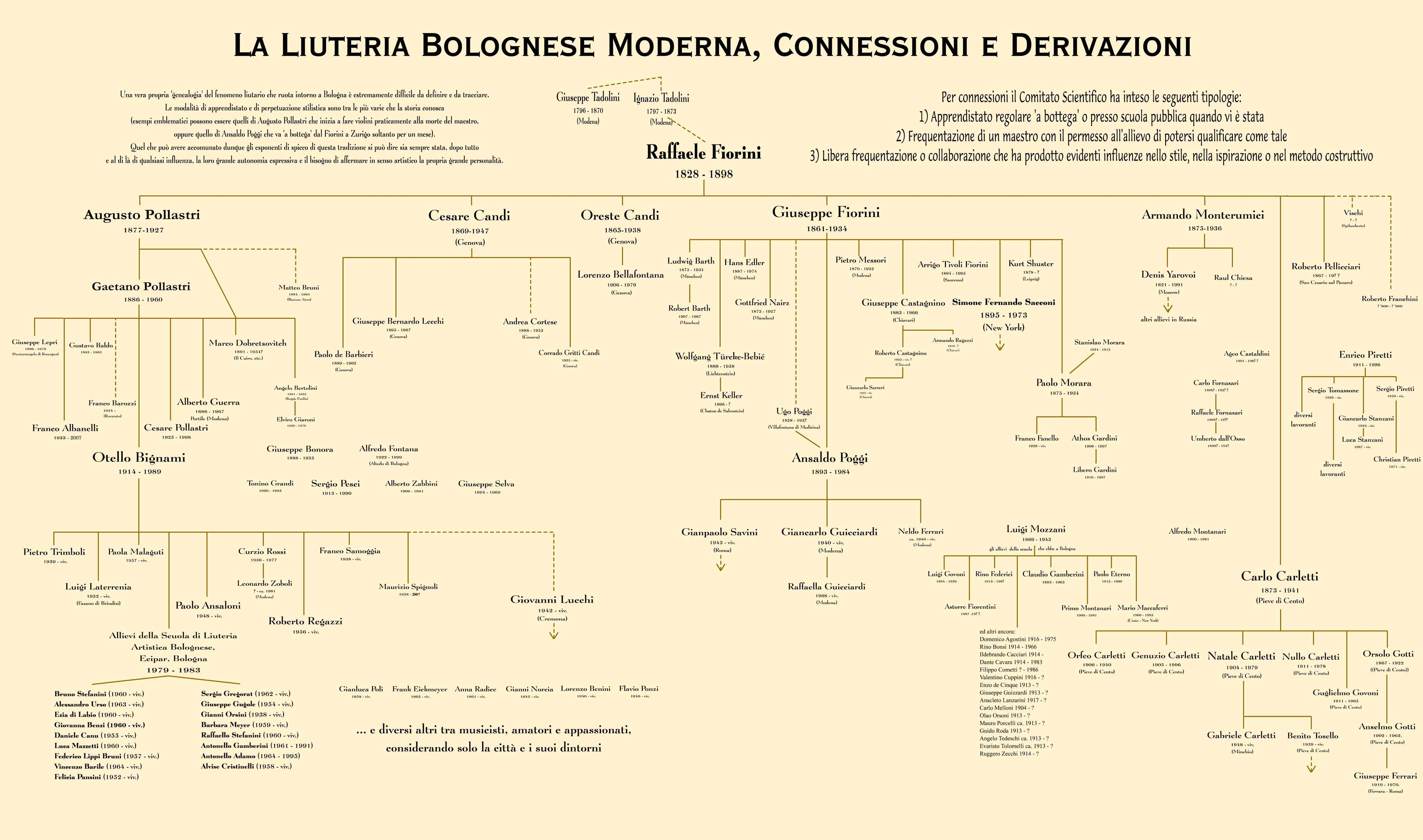
Modern Bolognese Violin-Making Table

Ansaldo Poggi (9 June 1893 – 4 September 1984) was an Italian luthier known as one of the greatest stringed instrument makers of the 20th century. He demonstrated his talent for the making of stringed instruments at a young age. His father, also an artisan, musician and amateur violinmaker, encouraged his son, steering him toward the arts. After the end of World War I he dedicated himself to the profession, taking up the craft again alongside his father while at the same time graduating from the Philharmonic Academy of Bologna. In 1921 he met up with the famous luthier Giuseppe Fiorini, of whom he was an adored disciple. In 1923 he won his first silver medal with a viola at the National Competition in Rome.

In 1925, 1927 and 1929 he was awarded many gold medals, which resulted in his no longer being permitted to compete. With the passing of the years Poggi became stylistically independent of Fiorini, and was soon producing instruments of a shape and reflecting a taste all his own. He became an enormous success on both a national and international level.

Gian Carlo Guicciardi, Giampaolo Savini and Neldo Ferrari have to be considered his students.

"Ansaldo Poggi is considered by most soloists the greatest violin maker of the 20th century. Most of his instruments are based on Stradivari model, sometimes on Guarneri and a personal model. During his lifetime, he made instruments for important musicians such as Mistislav Rostropovich, David Oistrakh, Nathan Milstein, Yehudi Menuhin, Isaac Stern, Aaron Rosand, and Uto Ughi, to name just a few. Violinist Aaron Rosand, sold his 10 million dollar Joseph Guarnerius violin in 2009 and now performs on an Ansaldo Poggi violin. Poggi made a total of 322 violins in his lifetime."
