= Gaetano Pollastri =

Italian luthier (1886 - 1960)

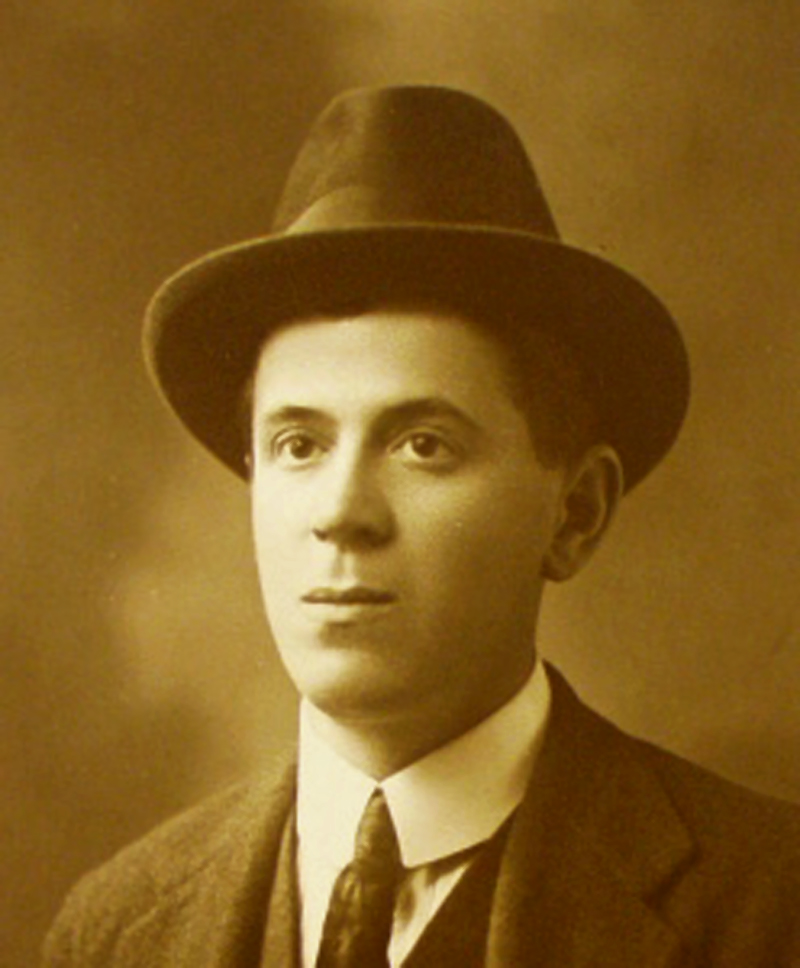
Gaetano Pollastri in his youth

Gaetano Pollastri (1886–1960) was a professional violinist but after the First World War he devoted himself to violin making. He worked with the same company as his brother in via Castiglione, that was devoted to the construction, repair and commerce of string instruments. In 1927 he received the Certificate of Honour at the contemporary violin making exhibition-competition in Cremona. When Augusto died in 1927, he took over his brother's company. In the following twenty years Gaetano constructed numerous instruments of which, in 1930, a violin with papal coat of arms that he personally donated to Pope Pious XI. He also restored precious violins; among them, a Stradivari and a Guarneri of Guglielmo Marconi brother's property, Alfonso. He won the Certificate of Honour in Cremona in 1949. In 1954 he showed two violins at the 2nd National Competition of Contemporary violin making in Rome, obtaining a Certificate of Honour, and was present with his instruments at the Ascoli Piceno ('54) and Pegli ('56) competitions. He worked very hard to promote his profession and was a founding associate of the ANLAI. His students include Cesare Pollastri, Franco Albanelli and Otello Bignami.

== Living Museum ==
Discover the history of the Bolognese School

'Up to the first half of the nineteenth century, Violin Making in Italy was in a standstill cycle; yet, during the second half of the century, Raffaele Fiorini it:Fiorini Raffaele gave new impulse to it. Thanks to him, born in Musiano di Pianoro, the luthier's ancient Art was brought back to a new life.' - History | Bolognese Violin Makers | www.ilsuonodibologna.org | The Violin making Tradition of Bologna

View a fine example of Gaetano Pollastri violin Bologna circa 1936 :

Gaetano Pollastri violin Bologna circa 1936

Gaetano Pollastri - violin 1936 top

Gaetano Pollastri - violin 1936 back

Gaetano Pollastri - violin 1936 f-hole closeup

Gaetano Pollastri - violin 1936 scroll
