= Giuseppe Pedrazzini =

Italian luthier (1879–1957)

Giuseppe Pedrazzini (Pizzighettone, near Cremona, 13 January 1879 – 19 October 1957) was an Italian violin maker. He was a pupil of Riccardo Antoniazzi and Romeo Antoniazzi in Milan, then began to work on his own there. He quickly gained recognition and won awards at various exhibitions, including those in Rome in 1920 and in Cremona in 1937. He modelled his instruments after various patterns, especially those of Stradivari, G.B. Guadagnini and Amati, all of which he interpreted freely. Tonally his work is among the best of the early 20th-century Italian makers. He was a meticulous and elegant craftsman; the scrolls of his instruments are always deeply carved, and the symmetrically rounded curves of the bouts and flanks provide a distinctive touch. Besides new instruments, he made a number of skilful antiqued copies. He used a variety of different labels and, depending on the period, one of three different brands. A good part of his output was exported, and he had particularly close ties with Hawkes & Son (later Boosey & Hawkes) in London. Among his pupils and associates were Ferdinando Garimberti, P. Parravicini and his nephew N. Novelli.

Although his work is extremely distinctive, Pedrazzini was unusually versatile in that as well as following the usual Amati' Grand Pattern, Amatese Stradivari and, more rarely, Guadagnini models, he also paid tribute to the old Milanese school by incorporating Giovanni Grancino’s influence into his own models and varnishing. The only other modern maker in Milan who ever tried his hand at this unusual model was Celeste Farotti, and this only in his antiqued copies, whereas Pedrazzini did so subtly in his straight work.

Pedrazzini’s distinctive scrolls – which are symmetrical, round, large yet delicate and deeply cut – are influenced by those of Giovanni Grancino with perhaps a bit of Amati. These carved, chamfered scrolls, as well as the angled position of the precisely cut, lightly fluted f-holes, are the features that most recall their classical Milanese prototypes. Pedrazzini’s, wide, rounded back buttons complement the scrolls.

His wood choice is nearly always of excellent quality and the purfling, positioned close to the neat channeling of the edge, is quite thin and often not very strongly stained. The backs are pinned with well-centered, round pins that are removed slightly from the purfling, although he sometimes omits the pins, particularly in his earlier work. The corners are quite triangular and generally stubby.

Because Pedrazzini used to be a woodmaker, he was quick to master the art of violin making and was already producing fine works, which were rated highly by musicians and his colleagues, that he opened his own workshop in 1906. A fine maker Leandro Bisiach, who was working with Antoniazzi at the time, was also attracted by Pedrazzini's works and started to ask Pedrazzini to make instruments for him.

When World War I began in 1914, Pedrazzini went to work as a woodworker at an aircraft manufacturing plant, where Bisiach's apprentice Giuseppe Ornati was working as well. It can be hypothesised that Pedrazzini and Ornati became friends there, discussed about instrument making between work and even made a few instruments, as Ornati's works dated during the war have been found.

After the war, Pedrazzini went back to making instruments and went onto win a Gold medal at a stringed instrument competition in Rome in 1920. From then on, Pedrazzini rose to fame and orders from outside Italy started to come in. By Bisiach's recommendation, Pedrazzini welcomed Ferdinando Garimerbti, an extreme talent with knife skills, as his apprentice and made instruments together. Pedrazzini's works were mostly modeled after Stradivari, Amati and Guadagnini, but showed his own personal interpretation with beautiful symmetry and absolute precision. Scrolls are usually deeply carved and his antiqued varnish was definitely his forte. He was a masterful copyist and has left numerous fine copies as well. In addition, Pedrazzini, like Bisiach, was a successful businessman dealing antique Italian instruments, which probably helped him circulate his own instruments to various dealers worldwide.

After winning a prize for his works of quartet at a stringed instrument competition in Cremona in 1937, Pedrazzini rose to even more fame and more orders were pouring in. One of his clients was Boosey & Hawkes, who made orders in bulk that Pedrazzini employed his nephew Natale Novelli and Piero Parravicini to work together to accommodate the abundant orders. Works from this period, in effect, are not as consistent as his own from the earlier period or the works he collaborated with Garimberti; however, Pedrazzini has indeed produced some of the finest instruments with bright and beautiful tone quality and left his name in history as one of the finest makers in Milan.

On a side note, when a musician is looking for a modern Italian violin and is not too fond of Fagnola's tone, more than 70% of them go on to prefer Pedrazzini's.
