= Igino Sderci =

Italian violin maker (1884–1983)

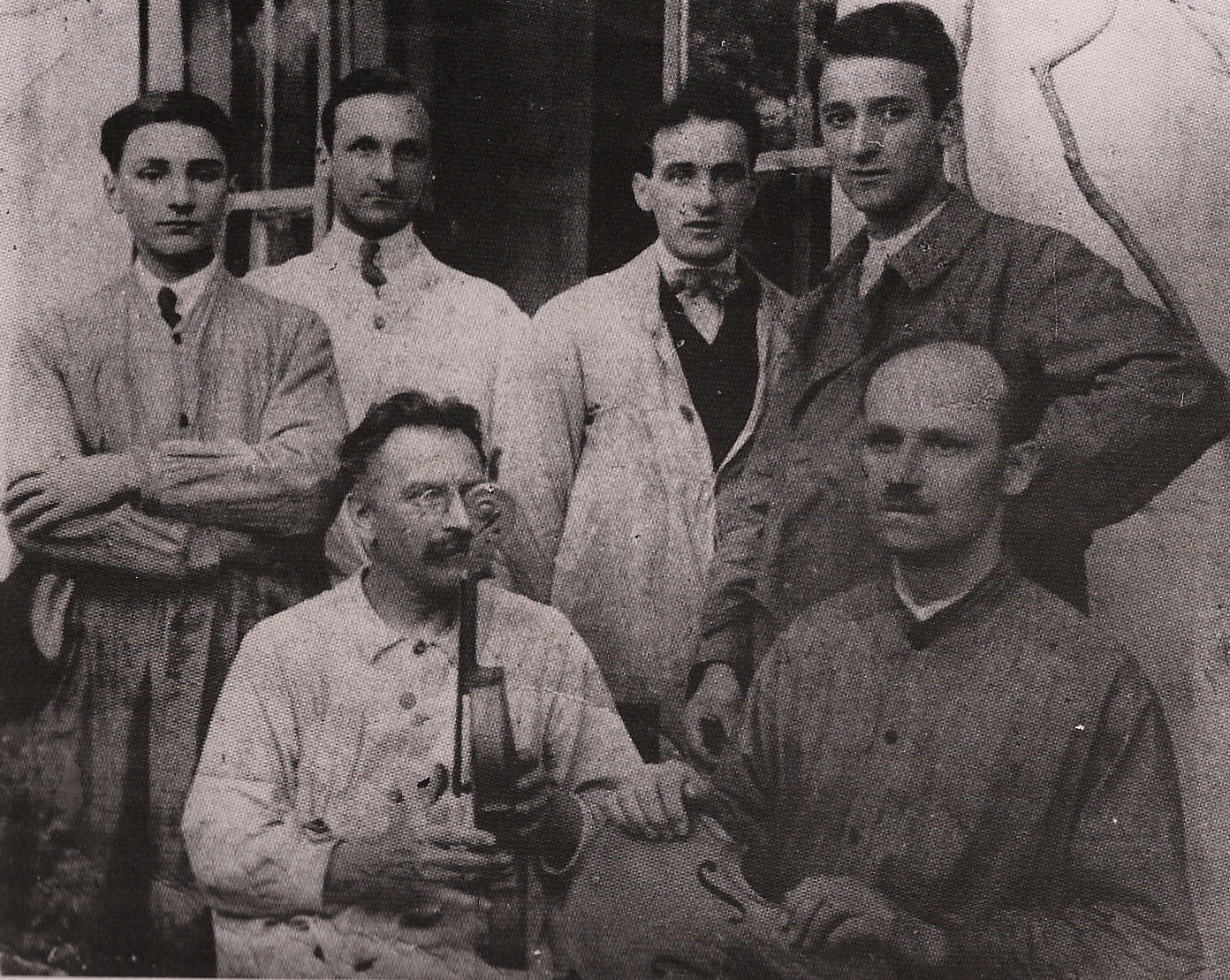
Igino Sderci with Leandro Bisiach & sons 1921

Igino (Iginius) Sderci (1884 - 1983, born in Gaiole in Chianti, Italy) was a violin maker who studied under master maker Leandro Bisiach. Making more than 700 instruments including many large violas, he won gold medals at the prestigious 1937 National Violin Making Exhibition and Competition in Cremona marking the bicentenary of Stradivari's death (as well as prizes in 1949).

== Biography ==
From his earliest childhood Igino Sderci was interested in music and art. He studied sculpture in Siena and had a gift for wood carving. He made his first violin without supervision. In 1917 Sderci was introduced to Leandro Bisiach by Don Fortunato (Sderci's brother) and Count Guido Chigi-Saracini in Siena. To Sderci's good fortune, he did not serve in the war owing to circulatory problems in his legs, a lifelong condition. Sderci had worked as a sculptor & carver for his uncles Tito and Giuseppe Corsini in Siena making richly decorated furniture, and then in a factory making ladies’ shoes, even designing some with removable heels. Recognizing his innate talent and needing an assistant, Sderci was taken on by Leandro Bisiach. At the end of the war, when Carlo Bisiach joined his family in Siena, Igino was put under Carlo's guidance for training. Sderci excelled quickly as he was ardent about violin making.

Newly found archival evidence (from Milan and Siena as well as De Paolis family) shows that “Sderci worked with Bisiachs mainly in Siena, and the only recorded time he visited Milan was for the wedding of Bisiach's daughter Amina to Lorenzo De Paolis (famous cellist) in 1921 at their villa in Venegono Superiore, near Milan.” The Historical Archive of Siena points out that “Igino Sderci emigrated to Florence on August 14, 1926” (not earlier). Hence Igino's early instrument Amatese Strad was labeled ‘fecit in SIENA Anno 1924’.

Igino Sderci became an important figure to have come out of the Bisiach workshop. After leaving Leandro's shop, he continued his collaboration with Bisiachs making instruments in the white for Giacomo and Leandro Jr., models of Camillo Camilli, Pietro Guarneri di Mantua, Stradivari 1732 Ex Busch and Amatise Stradivari. While for Carlo Bisiach he used G.B. Guadagnini, Amatise Stradivari and Stradivari 1709 models. He also made instruments in the white for Simone Ferdinando Sacconi.

Igino Sderci copied many models, created new designs and reflected their influence. He used wood of the highest quality and fine varnish mainly of an amber-yellow shade which were supplied by the Bisiachs.

He died at the age of 99 on May 24, 1983 in Florence. Igino trained his son, Luciano Sderci (b. 1924 in Siena - d. 1986 Florence), & was in the craft of violin making as well. Luciano went on to achieve much of the same success as his father, garnering awards in Cremona and Rome as well.

== Instruments ==
"The internal structure of his instruments reveal the choice of red willow for the lining and the corner blocks. The carved technique of the lining and the incision where these meet the corner blocks are always perfect. The f-holes and scroll are perfectly cut and the spiral line of the scroll is always precise." - 'I Maestri Del Novecento' - Carlo Vettori

Below is an example of one of Sderci's works. An instrument made as a copy of Andrea Guarneri in 1924 label reads: "Iginius Sderci fece Siena l'anno 1924"

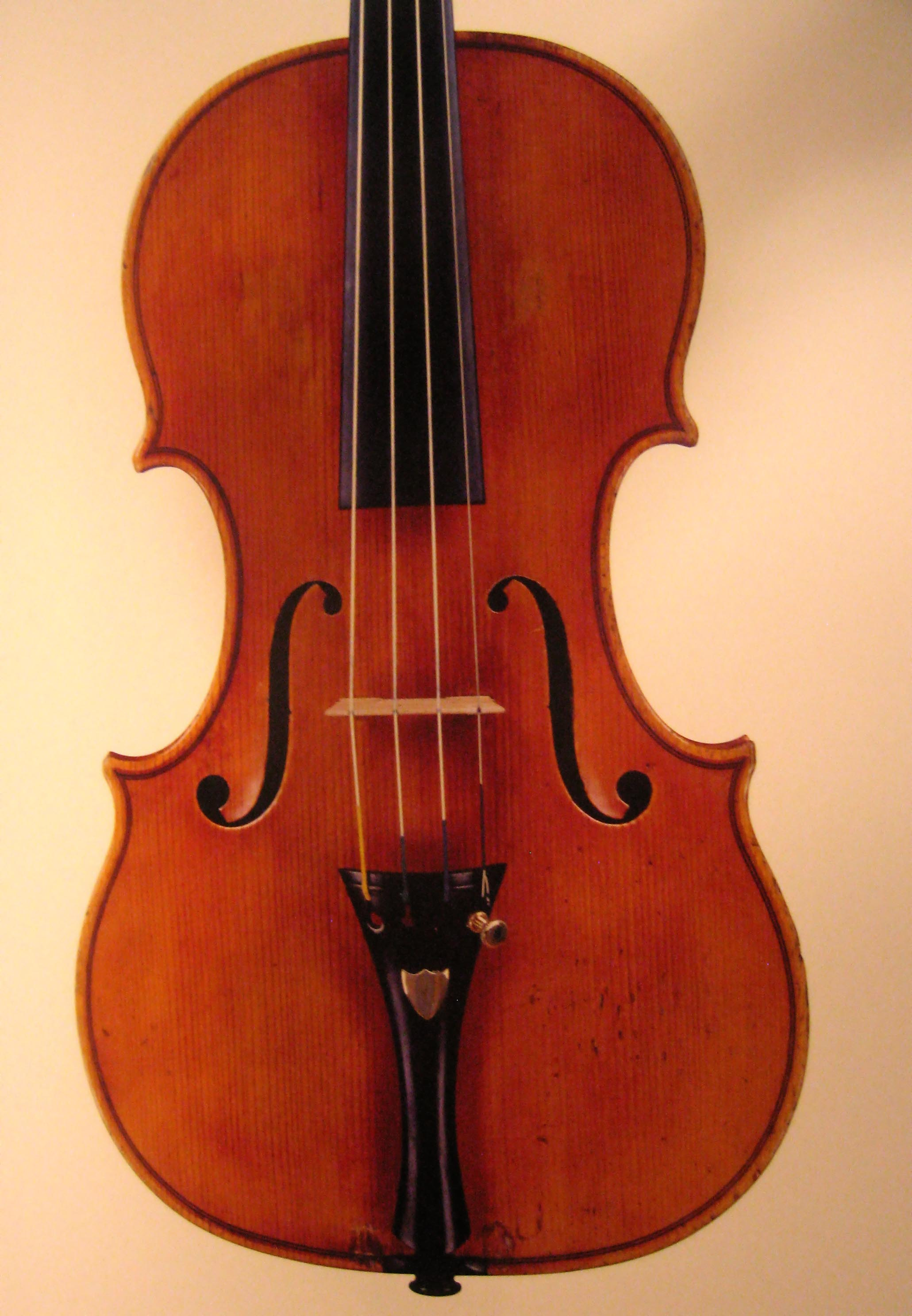
Igino Sderci violin top 1924

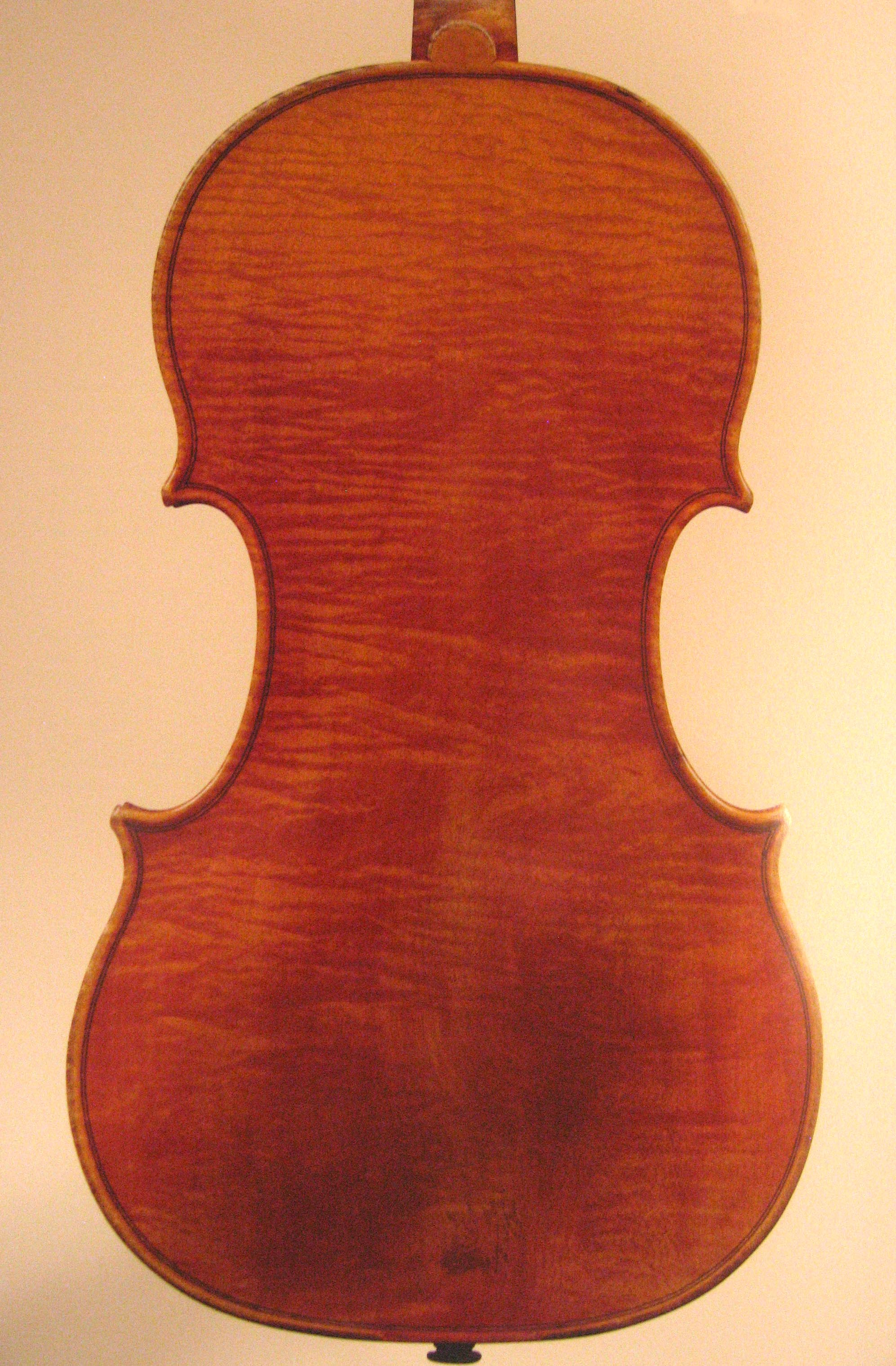
Igino Sderci violin back 1924

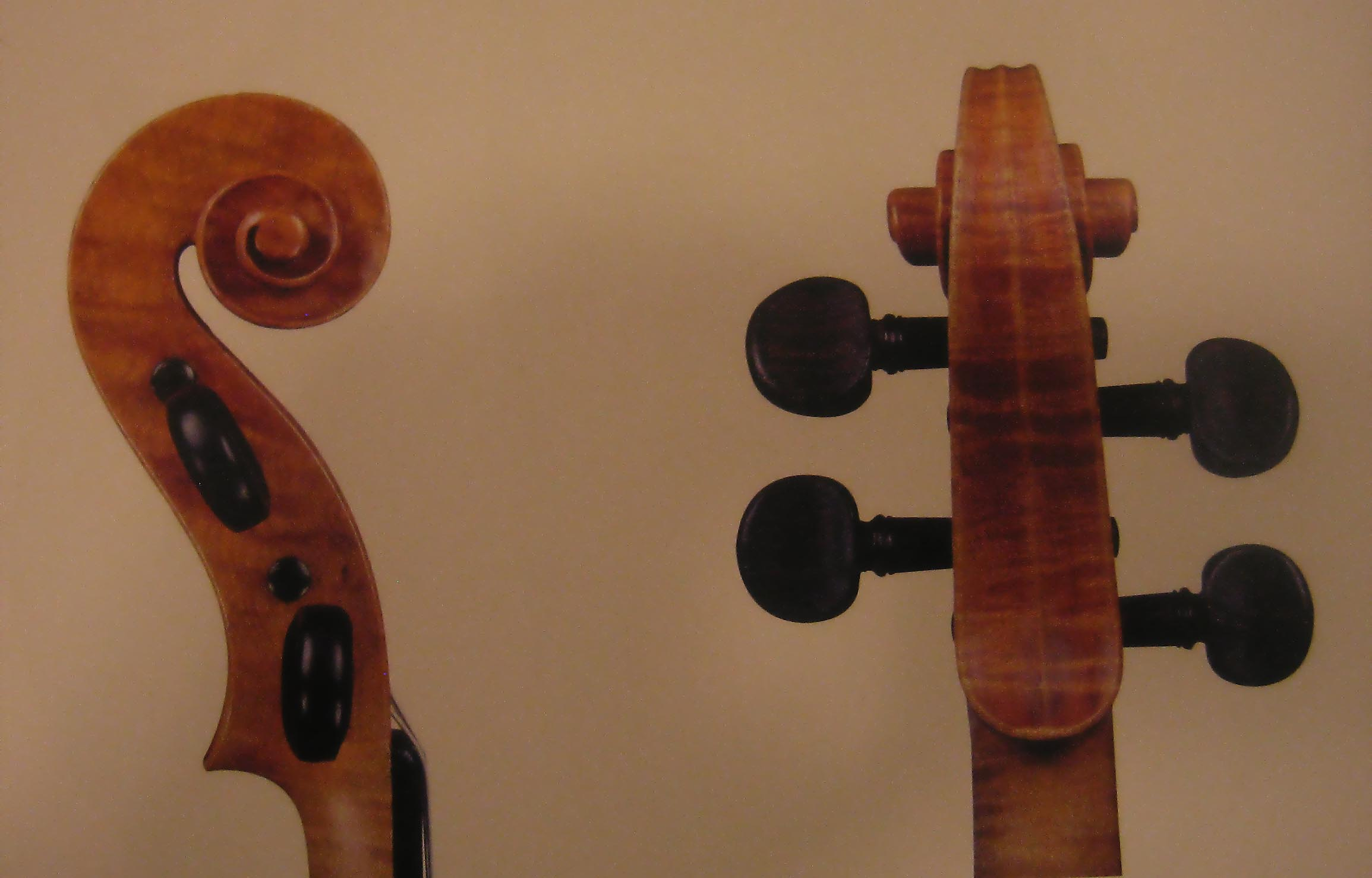
Igino Sderci violin scroll 1924

== External sources ==
Bisiach Family Heritage. by Philip J. Kass

=== Quotes ===
World Record Auction price October, 2007 Tarisio Auctions US$35,100 - tarisio

Igino Sderci has been called "one of Italy's very best makers. Excellent tone qualities." (Dictionary of 20th Century Italian Violin Makers - Marlin Brinser 1978).

However the most important event for the renaissance of violin-making in Lombardy was certainly the meeting between Riccardo Antoniazzi and Leandro Bisiach; the latter, thanks to his talent, his taste and his business ability succeeded in founding, at the end of the 19th century, a workshop which soon gained international fame. Bisiach was an outstanding figure in the commerce of antique violins but above all had the merit of raising a generation of great luthiers, among whom for example Sderci, Pietro Borghi, Giuseppe Ornati and Ferdinando Garimberti come to mind." - Liuteria Parmense
