= Enrico Ceruti =

Italian violin maker from Cremona

Enrico Ceruti (1806–1883) was an Italian violin maker born in Cremona, known as the last of the great line of violinmakers of Cremona.

He was the son of Giuseppe Ceruti and grandson of Giovanni Battista Ceruti. He was also an active dealer of fine old instruments, dealing with Luigi Tarisio and Jean-Baptiste Vuillaume among others.

Being a third-generation violin maker, he learned his trade from his father Giuseppe, and was a double bass player as well, like his father. Left the family home in 1826, and records show that by 1830 was registered as a violin maker, although few instruments from before 1840 survive. Experts speculate that it is conceivable that Enrico was working with his father during the period of 1840s-1850s, and it would explain the extreme rarity of instruments made by Giuseppe dating from that period.

At a time when the best European makers were imitating Stradivari and Guarneri del Gesu, Enrico followed a different path. Enrico's work shows that he drew much of his inspiration from the Bergonzis. Enrico exhibited his instruments in various European cities, but his work does not seem to have been greatly appreciated outside Italy. As a result, he had not attained any great wealth. His students include Gaetano Antoniazzi.

== Quotes ==
"Ceruti Dynasty carried on the tradition from the times of Storioni and Bergonzi's - and became the direct link to the 20th century makers. Gaetano Antoniazzi (who learned his craft in the Ceruti workshop), along with his sons Riccardo and Romeo trained Leandro Bisiach, and together with the Antoniazzis, Bisiach influenced the creation of a workshop environment that was to dominate early to middle 20th Century Italian violinmaking."

"Thanks to the efforts of many of those great makers (which began with Gaetano Antoniazzi) and later with support of people like Simone Fernando Sacconi, the glory of Cremona was re-established with the opening of the School of Violin Making (officially in 1938, Cremona)."
