= Antoniozzi =

Antoniozzi is an Italian surname. Notable people with the surname include:

- Alfredo Antoniozzi (born 1956), Italian politician, son of Alfredo
- Dario Antoniozzi (1923–2019), Italian politician

== See also ==
- Antoniazzi
