= Mordechai Schlein =

World War II figure (1930–1944)

Mordechai Schlein (1930 – 1944), also known as Motele, is a figure recounted in Jewish-Belarussian partisan history and literature, as a young violinist and partisan fighter during World War II. Born in Karmanovka, Byelorussia, he displayed musical talent from a young age, leading to his training with a local Jewish family.

Much of the narrative of Motele's life comes from Moshe Gildenman's memoir Motele der yunger partisan and other retellings, which were novelized. According to Gildenman, after his family was killed during the Nazi invasion of Byelorussia, Motele escaped and joined a group of Jewish partisans led by Gildenman. Utilizing his musical skills as a cover, he gathered intelligence on German troop movements and executed a sabotage mission against Nazi forces.

He is said to have been killed in a German bombardment or shot dead in 1944, at the age of 14. His restored violin has been preserved and showcased in various commemorations and exhibitions, and the 2024 short film NAKAM depicts his life.

== Biography ==
According to Moshe Gildenman's memoir Motele der yunger partisan and subsequent retellings, which were novelized, (Note: Motele was first recounted by Moshe Gildenman's memoir Motele der yunger partisan, (1950) but is fictionalized in later works. Suhl's Uncle Misha's Partisans (1973) notes that "most of the characters, places and events described in this book are fictitious, [though] inspired by an actual episode", similarly, Samuels' Mottele: A Partisan Odyssey (1976) and Gary's European Education (1944) fictionalize related events.) Mordechai Schlein was a Jewish-Belarussian partisan and violinist born in 1930 in the rural locality of Karmanovka, Byelorussia. He belonged to one of only two Jewish families in the area. The Schleins were millers who lived in modest circumstances, while their neighbors, the Gernstein family, traded beet and sugar and were relatively well-off. Recognizing Motele's musical talent, the Gernsteins took him in at the age of eight to learn the violin from one of their sons.

Gildenman writes that when Nazi forces invaded Byelorussia local residents disclosed the Schleins' and Gernsteins' locations to the occupiers. Motele's parents and younger sister, Bashiale, were killed alongside the Gernstein family. Motele managed to survive by hiding in the attic of the Gernstein home, and that same night, he fled with only his violin, seeking refuge in the nearby forests.

According to Gildenman, Motele was found by a Jewish partisans unit led by Moshe Gildenman near the Belarusian-Ukrainian border. In 1943, he received his first mission, which was partly assigned to him due not looking stereotypically Jewish. His task involved frequenting the nearby Ukrainian town of Ovruch, where he was tasked with blending with beggars outside a church, playing his violin to gather intelligence on German troop movements and activities.

One day, while performing, a German officer recruited Motele due to his ability to speak Ukrainian, to play regularly at a local restaurant that had been turned into a mess hall for the soldiers. This position provided Motele with the opportunity to overhear sensitive conversations. During his time at the restaurant, he noticed large cracks in the building's storage rooms and devised a plan to hide explosives within the structure.

Gildenman reports that Motele gradually transported 18 kilograms (40 lb) of incendiary material in his violin case, concealing the explosives in the cellar walls during breaks in his performances. The opportunity to execute his plan arose when members of the Schutzstaffel visited the restaurant. After performing for the German officers, Motele ignited the explosives and managed to escape, rejoining his fellow partisans. Upon reaching safety, he declared, "This is for my parents and little Bashiale."

== Death and legacy ==
According to Gildenman, Motele continued to participate in partisan activities until he was 14, being killed in either a German bombardment or shot dead when trying to warn a Red Army officer of German soldiers lying in ambush. Following his death, his violin was taken by Moshe Gildenman, who carried it through Berlin, Paris, and eventually to Israel, where he died in 1958. The story of Motele has been retold in several works of literature, including 's Uncle Misha's Partisans (1973) and Gertrude Samuels' Mottele: A Partisan Odyssey (1976).

In 2008, the violin was restored by Amnon Weinstein. In 2014, the Israel Postal Company issued the Violins of Hope stamp series to commemorate the legacy of Jewish musicians during the Holocaust, including a tribute to Mordechai Schlein. Additionally, the German Historical Museum hosted an exhibition dedicated to the Holocaust, featuring Motele's violin. In September 2023, a violinist, David Strongin, performed with Motele's violin during a concert at the walls of the Old City of Jerusalem, concluding the event with the violinist Itzhak Perlman on Hatikvah. Strongin played the violin again during the opening ceremonies for Yad Vashem's commemoration of Yom HaShoah on April 20, 2024.

In 2024, the short film NAKAM directed by Ilya Chaiken, was released portraying the story of Mordechai Schlein. NAKAM was nominated to and received several accolades, including a nomination to Academy Award for Best Live Action Short Film, Best Short Film at the 2024 Jerusalem Film Festival and the Audience Award at the 2024 San Francisco Jewish Film Festival.

== Works cited ==
- Stichnothe, Hadassah (2021). "Vista de Violencia y resistencia en la literatura infantil y juvenil judía sobre la Shoah" [Violence and resistance in Jewish children's and young adult literature about the Shoah]. Revista Cambios y PermanenciasGrupo de Investigación Historia, Archivística y Redes de Investigación (in European Spanish). 12 (1). Universidad Industrial de Santander: 126–172. ISSN 2027-5528. Archived from the original on 2025-07-17.
