= Bisiach =

Bisiach is a family name of Italian origin. It may refer to:

- Carlo Bisiach (1892–1968), Italian violin maker
- Gianni Bisiach (1927–2022), Italian journalist and writer
- Leandro Bisiach (1864–1945), Italian violin maker
