= Sesto Rocchi =

Italian violin maker (1909–1991)

- Born: 1909; Reggio Emilia
- Died: 1991 (aged 81–82)
- Occupation: Violin maker

Sesto Rocchi (1909–1991) was a violin maker from Reggio Emilia, Italy.

== Biography ==
Sesto Rocchi was born in Reggio Emilia, Italy. He started his violin making studies at the School of Violin Making at the Parma Conservatory under Gaetano Sgarabotto. After approximately 6 years of study, he moved to Milan to further his learning with Leandro Bisiach. Between 1956 and 1988 Sesto served on every prestigious violin making body including an appointment (1980) as the custodian of the Niccolò Paganini Guaneri del Gesu “Canon”.

He acquired over 17 international competition awards for his violins from 1952 to 1966. Sesto Rocchi made as many as ten quartets and a few antiqued instruments following in the steps of his masters, Sgarabotto and Bisiach. His experience in the Leandro Bisiach workshop where he made many instruments and where he could observe and copy antique instruments was extremely useful to his own career.

=== Rocchi honored ===
To mark the 50th anniversary of the foundation of their club, the members of the Rotary of Reggio Emilia in Italy organized a tribute (in the spring of 1999) to noteworthy personalities of their town, including violin maker Sesto Rocchi. Rocchi’s work contributed to the rebirth of violin making in the region after the difficult times of World War II.

== Quotes ==
"Sesto Rocchi’s inborn capacities, his personal involvement, the passion that inhabited him, but mostly the teachings that he received from Gaetano Sgarabotto in Parma and Leandro Bisiach in Milan helped him become one of the best Italian contemporary makers. His curious mind was always on alert, and his receptive attitude toward young people interested in violin making was remarkable."

—Gualtiero Nicolini, president of ALI (Associazione Liutaria Italiana), a teacher at the Cremona School of Violin Making, and an author of books on lutherie.

"I feel proud to have had him as a colleague and then as a friend. The legacy left by Rocchi demonstrates that even in the 20th century, it is possible to conduct the activities of a violin maker with nobility."

—Gianfranco Boretti, author of a book on Rocchi "Life for Violin Making". -"In forma d'istrumento", Reggio Emilia 1985

== Instruments ==
"His work is very precise and the varnish varies from a warm orange to brownish red. He was constantly occupied with varnish experiments and research. He used Stradivarian "Amatise" and Guarneri models. The sonority is always excellent". - 'Liuteria Italiana vol. 1' - Eric Blot 1994

"Rocchi is considered one of the finest modern Italian makers and many of his instruments are now being copied by shops and makers" - Life for Violin Making by Gianfranco Boretti

Viewed below, is an example of his work. Sesto Rocchi violin 1975 made for his daughter.

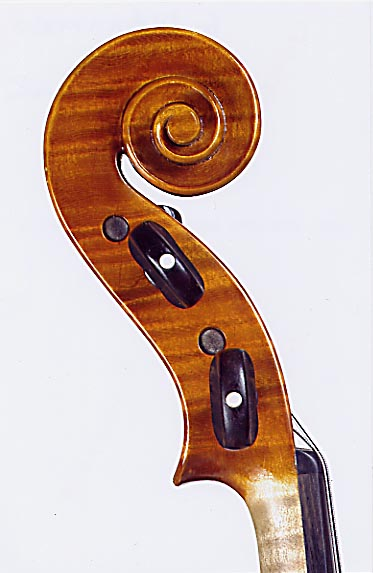
Sesto Rocchi violin scroll 1975

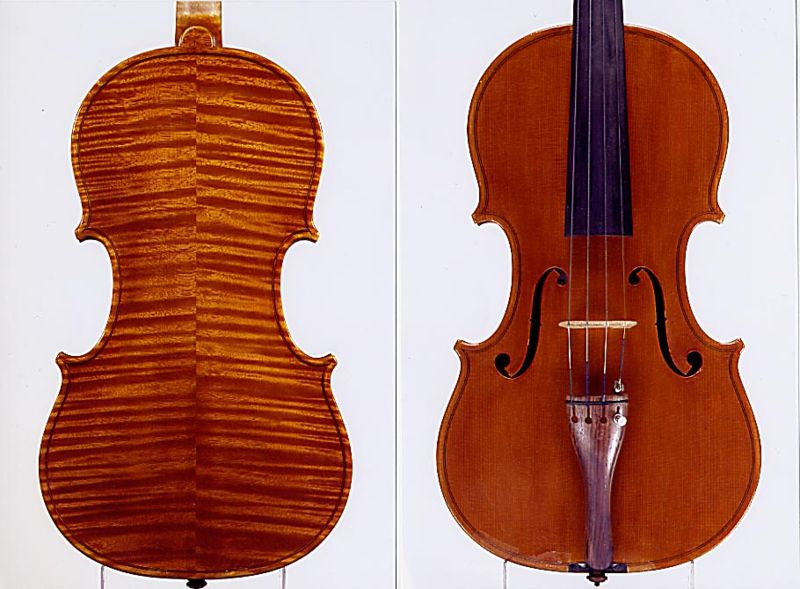
Sesto Rocchi violin 1975
