= Luciano Sderci =

20th Century Italian violin maker

Luciano Sderci (13 December 1924, in Florence – 22 June 1986, in Florence) was an Italian violin maker.

== Biography ==
Luciano Sderci began his career in 1945 while studying the art of violin-making from his father Igino Sderci. Starting out as merely an errand boy, Luciano learned about all the complementary work that needed to be done by a violin-maker such as shipping instruments and even constructing the wooden boxes to send them in. Eventually, Luciano began to make his own instruments working alongside his father and in 1946 completed his first instrument.

Luciano's progress was supported heavily by his father who carried out a lot of the more complicated work himself. This is seen in some of Luciano's earlier instruments which clearly show the hand of Igino. Luciano eventually developed his own style of making instruments with a freedom of hand. He differentiated himself from his father, whose style more focused on technique and precision. While Luciano's instruments have excellent acoustics, his varnish was somewhat less refined that of his father. Igino and Luciano were a supportive duo and were continually inspired and motivated by one another.

Igino had wanted Luciano to learn how to restore instruments, seeking the help of the Bisiach brothers Andrea and Carlo Bisiach who were more than happy to help. Luciano however never took advantage of this opportunity and preferred to learn from his father with whom he worked alongside for the majority of his career.

By the second half of the 1950s however, both Luciano and Igino were making their own instruments. Luciano and his father's work were very similar and often compared, which acted as a strong stimulus for Luciano to reach his exceptional level of craftsmanship.

In 1949 Luciano won an award for being the youngest participant at the Biannual celebration of Antonio Stradivarius' anniversary in Cremona. Subsequently, in 1952 he won first place in the National Competition of Contemporary Violin-making for violins and violas in Rome.

In the 1970s Luciano created some of his own models, initiating the first large divergence from his father's guidance. His models were inspired by the 17th-century Florentine violin maker Rocco Doni.

Today, two of Luciano's instruments, a violin and viola, are part of the collection of the Public Music School of Florence, Conservatorio Luigi Cherubini, kept in the nearby museum of the Galleria dell'Accademia.

Luciano's work is somewhat hard to find today; scholars have not excluded the possibility that some of his works may have been labelled by dealers at a later date with the name of his father whose instruments can be sold for a higher price.

As Luciano's career grew, his health declined. Already by the mid 1960s Luciano's commitment and quality of work had gone down due to a circulatory problem in his legs. He died on 22 June 1986, only three years after his father. He did not have any children and therefore there was no one to carry on the family business.

== Quotes ==
World Record Auction price for Luciano Sderci is US$22,800 in November, 2011 for a Viola Tarisio Auctions - Tarisio Auctions
