= Giovanni Rota (luthier) =

Italian luthier

Giovanni Rota (1767-before 1829) apprenticed under the influential Italian luthier Lorenzo Storioni from approximately 1787 to 1792, and spent his later years between Cremona and Mantua as a luthier. Not much about Giovanni's early life is known, save for his apprenticeship under this famous luthier. He was born in Cremona, Italy which at the time was under control of the Austrian Empire, and was in close contact with Giovanni Battista Ceruti, who was also apprenticed under Lorenzo Stiorini.

It is speculated that because Giovanni worked under other luthiers, much of his work was never attributed under to him. This adds to the rarity of violins with his name on them, as there are few that he crafted independently.

It was in Mantua where Giovanni worked with the luthier Tommaso Balestrieri, and moved there after eagerly finishing his apprenticeship under Lorenzo Stiorini.

== Quality of his work ==
While we will never have a full insight as to the quality of Giovanni's work, as much of his work is thought to be unattributed, we do have the few pieces which bear his name to make an educated guess as to his skill and attention to quality and detail. One auctioneer describes his work as "rather rough... the purfling is careless, the wood not particularly handsome", while another: "Very careful workmanship. He applied a fat yellow-brown or red varnish". From these two auctioneer descriptions, it appears that his work varies in quality, although it may be based on the year or on the city where he crafted the violins. Another, likely German, auctioneer described his work as clearly showing "the decline of art in Cremona. His violins are made raw, made the deposit dissolute, the wood unattractive, the yellow paint inconspicuous." While this may be a bit harsher for criticism, it does make some good points that the other auctioneers failed to address about Giovanni's attributed violins. They are made of, like most violins produced in Cremona, poor quality lumber as that was all which was available.
