= Lorenzo Storioni =

Italian luthier (1744 - 1816)

Lorenzo Storioni (1744 — 1816) is considered one of the last of the classic Cremonese master violin makers/luthiers of the 18th century.

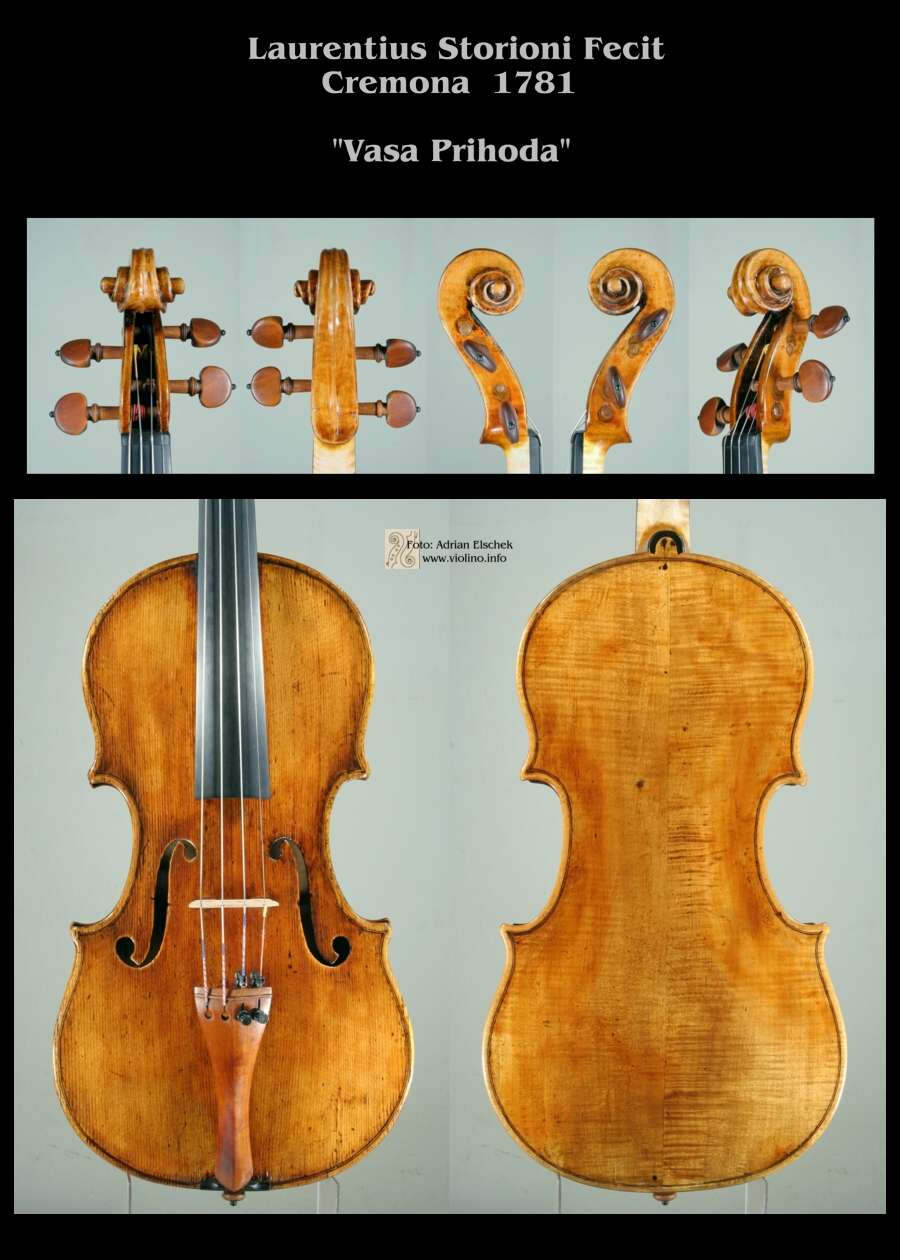

Born a generation after Stradivarius and Guarnerius, and with no direct link to the great tradition, Lorenzo Storioni revived violin-making in Cremona with his own work and that of his two followers, Giovanni Rota (born 1767) and Giovanni Battista Ceruti (1756-1817).

He was influenced by makers of the previous generations such as Giovanni Battista Guadagnini and Tommaso Balestrieri, and between 1775 and 1795 manufactured a massive number of high-quality stringed instruments in a conventional manner. However, Storioni made some bold adjustments with his extreme creativeness. He changed the position of the F-hole, selected unusual materials (such as local wild maple), and decorated his instruments with a wide and rugged fringe, giving them strong but elegant looks as well as excellent sound.

He used a spirit varnish which sometimes appears to have saturated the wood.

His choice of wood was not always the best, but that is due to the times in which he was living. From the 1750s to the end of the century Italy endured many wars, and instrument makers at times had much difficulty in finding materials. Decades of war, reforms, and repeated conquests by the French and Austrians dismantled the social and economic structure of Cremona - as Duane Rosengard explains in a 1991 paper published in the Journal of the Violin Society of America. "In the 1770s, just as Storioni emerged, the guilds that had governed the skilled crafts since the Middle Ages were abolished by the conquering Austrians. The Jesuit fathers, whose educational institutions were major patrons of the violin makers, were suppressed by the Pope; and the lay corporations, who conducted commerce on behalf of Cremona's religious orders, were abolished. The church and nobility—primary patrons of the violin makers—lost power and money as the French and Austrians taxed and requisitioned treasure out of Italy to pay for the wars."

Many of Storioni's instruments are of broad grain in the upper table. He enjoyed working with the Joseph Guarnerius model. He is known to have made magnificent double basses.

His successors include Giovanni Battista Ceruti, Giovanni Rota and Giovanni Francesco Pressenda.

If rough work and poor wood characterized the Storioni-Rota-Ceruti school, they still find favor with musicians. “They were not the tidy boys, but they're all acoustically rock solid,” says Boston violin maker Marilyn Wallin, who enjoys working on them for this reason. “As a group, they didn't have the best wood, but they did know what to do with it.”

Mstislav Rostropovich owned and played a Storioni cello.

An Orchestra size Cornerless Double Bass (ex-Bob Riccardi - Pennsylvania Ballet) was provisionally attributed to him.

The auction record for this maker is $664,821 in March 2017, for a violin.
