= Celeste Farotti =

Celeste Farotti (1864 – 1928) was a violin maker in the modern Milanese school. Though his apprenticeship is uncertain, he completed his training in the workshop of Leandro Bisiach, finally opening his own shop in Milan around 1900. He was a connoisseur of Italian violin making, and a gifted copyist. After an accident during a mountain trip, Celeste stopped working and his nephew, Celestino Farotto (born 1905), ran the shop until his death.

An air of mystery surrounds some of his work, and there are many legends about him, as there are about other makers who made "copies" of instruments that they made look old. Like Gaetano Sgarabotto or Vincenzo Sannino, he frequently enjoyed reproducing the wear and tear of antique instruments.

== Bibliography ==
- La Liuteria Italiana / Italian Violin Making in the 1800s and 1900s - Umberto Azzolina
- I Maestri Del Novicento - Carlo Vettori
- La Liuteria Lombarda del '900 - Roberto Codazzi, Cinzia Manfredini 2002
- Dictionary of 20th Century Italian Violin Makers - Marlin Brinser 1978
- Blot, Eric (1994). "Emilia e Romagna I". Un secolo di liuteria italiana, 1860-1960 - A century of Italian violin making. Cremona: Turris. ISBN 88-7929-026-6.
- Vannes, Rene (1985) [1951]. Dictionnaire Universel del Luthiers (vol.3). Bruxelles: Les Amis de la musique. OCLC 53749830.
- William, Henley (1969). Universal Dictionary of Violin & Bow Makers. Brighton; England: Amati. ISBN 0-901424-00-5.
- "Giovanni Iviglia - Celeste Farotti "Portrait of a violin maker"". Archived from the original on 2009-01-06.
