= Amnon Weinstein =

Israeli luthier (1939–2024)

- אמנון ויינשטיין
- Born: 21 July 1939; Tel Aviv, Mandatory Palestine
- Died: 4 March 2024 (aged 84); Tel Aviv, Israel
- Occupations: Luthier; philanthropist
- Organization: Violins-of-Hope Collection
- Website: www.Violins-of-Hope.com

Amnon Weinstein (Hebrew: אמנון ויינשטיין; 21 July 1939 – 4 March 2024) was an Israeli luthier. He was the founder and promoter of the Violins-of-Hope Collection.

== Early life ==
Amnon Weinstein was born in Tel Aviv during the Mandate era. He was married to the journalist Assaela Weinstein who was the daughter of Asael Bielski, one of the anti-Nazi Bielski partisans immortalized in the movie, Defiance.

Weinstein's father, Moshe Weinstein who was born in 1909 in Poland, had studied the violin at the conservatoire in Vilnius, Lithuania, which was a part of Poland at that time. He trained as a violin maker with Yaakov Zimmermann in Warsaw. In 1938 he emigrated to British Palestine and founded the luthier business of Weinstein in Tel Aviv. One of his first works was servicing the Palestine Symphony Orchestra that had just been created by Bronislaw Huberman. When the news of the persecution of the Jews in Germany reached Palestine, the musicians who had been fond of their German violins before, either broke them or burned them and some told Moshe that they would throw them away if he did not buy them. So Weinstein's father started to collect violins. When he learned, after the war, that all his relatives he had left behind in Eastern Europe had been murdered, he suffered a heart attack. From then on, Moshe Weinstein never wanted to talk about his family again.

Weinstein apprenticed with his father before he studied violin making in Cremona with Pietro Sgarabotto and Giuseppe Ornati and Ferdinando Garimberti.

== Violins of Hope ==
Amnon Weinstein managed the Violins-of-Hope Collection together with his son Avshalom Weinstein who is a luthier in Istanbul.

In the 1980s, Weinstein had made his first encounter with a violin from the Holocaust. A young man brought him one that had belonged to his grandfather for repair. When Weinstein opened it up, he found black powder inside, soon realizing that it was ashes from the crematoria of Auschwitz, where the grandfather had last played the instrument.

From 1996, Weinstein started to systematically collect string instruments that were connected with the Holocaust. At that time no one in Israel would buy German instruments, and so they were mothballed. Weinstein restored these instruments and collected the stories. Originally limited to violins of emigrants, Weinstein started to concentrate on instruments that had in some way to do with the Holocaust. Today the Violins-of-Hope Collection comprises more than 60 instruments.

In the first decade of the new millennium, Weinstein started to use the instruments of the Violins-of-Hope Collection to initiate concerts and to combine the concerts with educational events teaching about the Holocaust.

In 2008, Weinstein initiated the first major concerts in Istanbul and Jerusalem. Conducted by Omer Welber, the Istanbul Philharmonic and the Ra'anana Symphonette accompanied Israeli virtuoso Shlomo Mintz (with whom Weinstein had maintained a longstanding friendship), Yair Dalal and Turkey's Cihat Askin as they played sixteen violins that had outlasted the Holocaust. It was followed in September 2010 by concerts at the 46th Sion International Music Festival in Sion, Switzerland and on 27 January 2011 at the International Holocaust Remembrance Day in Madrid.

In 2012, Weinstein and the violins from the Violins-of-Hope Collection travelled the USA for the first time. The exhibition and concerts were organized by the University of North Carolina at Charlotte, North Carolina.

In May 2013, his violins were played at the Grimaldi Forum in Monaco by the Orchestre philharmonique de Monte-Carlo. Concerts and exhibitions in Rome and in the Villa Musica in Neuwied, Germany, followed in 2014.

On the occasion of the celebration of the 70th anniversary of the liberation of Auschwitz, Weinstein's work was recognized by an exhibition and a concert with the Berlin Philharmonic Orchestra under Sir Simon Rattle at the Berliner Philharmonie.

In 2016 and 2017, Weinstein organized concerts and exhibitions in Monterrey, Mexico, Houston, Texas, Cleveland, Ohio, Jacksonville and Sarasota, Florida, the Library of Congress in Washington, D.C. and in Bucharest, Romania.

In March 2018, the Violins-of-Hope played with the Nashville Symphony in Nashville, Tennessee.

== Death ==
Weinstein died on 4 March 2024 in Tel Aviv at the age of 84.

== Memberships and awards ==
Weinstein won a gold medal and a certificate of excellence for violin-sound at Salt Lake City in 1982; he was a member of Entente International des Maître Luthiers et Archetiers d’Art; a member of Bienfaiteur de Groupement des Luthiers et Archetiers d’Art de France; and was a member of the Violin Society of America. He served as a judge in the violin-makers' competition in Salt Lake City in 1998 and as a judge in the Étienne Vatelot Concours, Paris 2004. He was awarded the prestigious Ole Bull prize, Bergen, Norway, 2007. As one of the founders of Keshet Eilon violin master courses, he operated a violin-making atelier and lectured on the instruments' history, construction and care.

Weinstein received the Medal of the Order of Merit of the Federal Republic of Germany, signed by the president and handed to him by Foreign Minister, Frank-Walter Steinmeier in a ceremony held in the Jewish Museum in Berlin on 14 December 2016. He also received the Ernst-Cramer-Medal for the Violins-of-Hope project by the Israel-German association (Deutsch-Israelische Gesellschaft e.V.).

In 2014, the Israel Postal Company issued a new stamp celebrating the Violins-of-Hope. The stamp, titled "Violins that Survived the Holocaust," depicts a violin adorned with a Star of David, a common symbol of the Violins-of-Hope. In the background is a sketch of the barbed-wire fence at Auschwitz.
