= Antoniazzi =

Antoniazzi is an Italian surname. It derived from the Antonius root name. Notable people with the surname include:

- Gaetano Antoniazzi (1825–1897), Italian violin maker
- Gianni Antoniazzi (born 1998), Swiss footballer
- Ilario Antoniazzi (born 1948), Italian archbishop of Tunis
- Manon Antoniazzi (born 1965), British civil servant
- Riccardo Antoniazzi (1853–1912), Italian violin maker
- Romeo Antoniazzi (1862–1925), Italian violin maker
- Tonia Antoniazzi (born 1971), British politician

== See also ==
- Angelo Antonazzo
