= Giacomo Bisiach =

Italian luthier

Giacomo Bisiach (Milan, 28 November 1900 – Venegono Superiore, 8 May 1995) was an Italian luthier.

== Biography ==
Giacomo Bisiach is the sixth of Leandro Bisiach's seven children.

Born in Milan in Via Silvio Pellico on 28 November 1900, he devoted himself to the study of the cello at the Milan School of Music.

It was in fact his father Leandro's opinion that a good luthier, to produce excellent instruments, should be well aware of the intrinsic problems posed by the playing of a stringed instrument.

Having been a very young soldier in a heavy field artillery regiment in Aqui for four years, Giacomo took part in the Great War as it was drawing to a close and joined his father Leandro in Siena immediately after he was discharged.

In the Tuscan city, Count Guido Chigi-Saracini had commissioned Leandro in 1916 to create and organise a museum of antique musical instruments, with a lutherie workshop attached. In Siena Giacomo met the Chianti woodcarver Igino Sderci who, at the age of thirty, after having met the Bisiach family, dedicated his skills to violin making.

Under the guidance of the latter and above all of his father and elder brother Carlo, Giacomo, together with his younger brother Leandro Jr, refined their skills until, at the beginning of the 1920s, the Bisiach family, having concluded their experience in Siena, returned to Milan. Only Carlo, who had met and married the pianist Daria Guidi, remained in Tuscany in Florence.

In Milan, in Piazza Duomo 2, in his father's atelier, Giacomo studied in depth the workmanship of the instruments made by the master luthiers of the Italian classical tradition, due to the greatest musicians of that time who'd continuously turn to the luthier's workshop for the maintenance of their instruments.

In 1930, Giacomo married Giuseppina Oddono, a Latinist and Greek scholar, the daughter of a well-known doctor in the province of Como, and with whom he had five children.

Following the production model of his father Leandro, Giacomo first specialised in varnishing and then in restoration. He then went on to working in the field of painting.

Leandro Sr's most significant idea, which led his workshop to excel and to revive the great tradition of Italian violin making in the early 1900s, was to organise production in such a way as to overcome the concept of the all-rounder luthier. Leandro promoted and stimulated the work of a real team, made up of different talents, so that the production of instruments was the sum of each person's skills, a way of working which reminisces that of the great Renaissance masters of art.

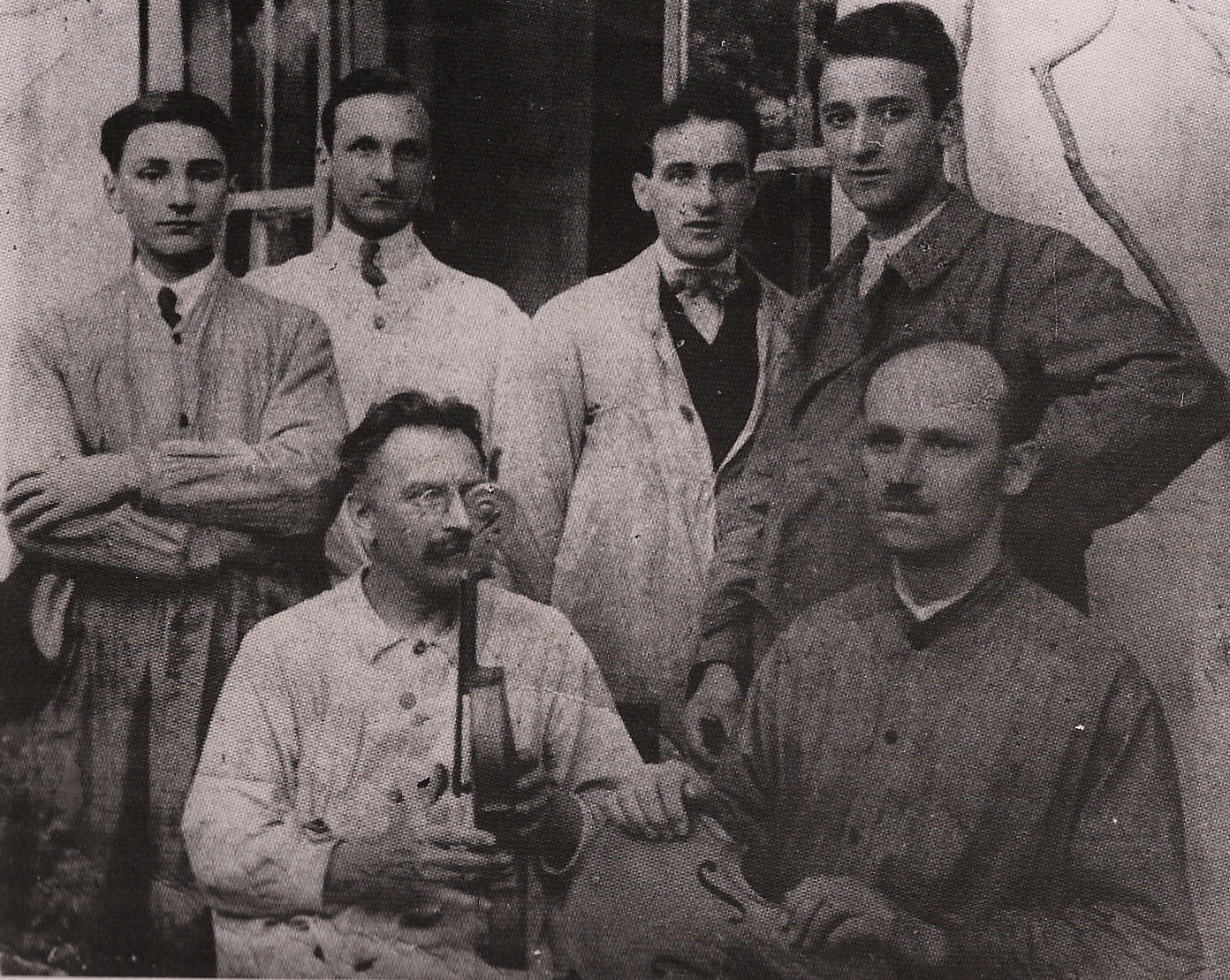
the Bisiach family of luthiers

In the Bisiach workshop luthiers such as Ornati and Sgarabotto were trained, as well as the brothers Riccardo and Romeo Antoniazzi. The students of the workshop specialised above all in the initial construction of the instrument, while Leandro Bisiach Senior took care of the finishing touches such as the thicknesses, the varnishing, the sonority: in practice the final overall arrangement of the instrument.

Giacomo Bisiach was, out of the five sons, the one who dedicated himself most specifically to the varnishing and finishing of the instruments.

The violins made in the Bisiach workshop almost all ended up making it to America or Japan, under the careful supervision of the master craftsmen of the Milan Fine Arts Department who certified their authenticity and value.

Their friendship with the art critic and director of the Pinacoteca di Brera, Fernanda Wittigens, was historic.

Giacomo Bisiach's expertise in the development of the instrument was such that the musicologist, artist and engraver Benvenuto Disertori, professor of Renaissance musical palaeography in Cremona and Parma, defined him as the "psychiatrist of the violin, because he knows how to put its soul in order".

The qualities of Giacomo were appreciated by concert performers such as Pablo Casals, Yehudi Menuhin, Massimo Amfiteatrof, and Nathan Milstein, who constantly called upon his services to have the most top-performing instruments.

Giacomo and Leandro Jr, who had always collaborated in an effective partnership, had their atelier in Corso Magenta, 27. When the city of Milan was bombed in 1943, they almost entirely lost the fabulous collection of instruments and antique objects that their father had acquired over time. After the war they were able to rebuild an enviable collection. When the two brothers dissolved their partnership in 1970, they set up a lutherie workshop at the Museum of Science and Technology in Milan, which still tells of Lombardy's excellence in this art.

In his residence in Venegono Superiore, Giacomo continued his profession for another 25 years, maintaining frequent contacts with Italian and foreign violinmakers and continually receiving young students who wanted to undertake the art of violinmaking.

He died on 8 May 1995, while listening to Beethoven's concerto in D major for violin and orchestra, as he had wished.

== Bibliography ==
- Eric Blot, Un secolo di Liuteria Italiana 1860–1960 – A century of Italian Violin Making – Emilia e Romagna I, Cremona 1994. ISBN 88-7929-026-6
- La Liuteria Italiana / Italian Violin Making in the 1800s and 1900s – Umberto Azzolina
- I Maestri Del Novicento – Carlo Vettori
- La Liuteria Lombarda del '900 – Roberto Codazzi, Cinzia Manfredini 2002
- Dictionary of 20th Century Italian Violin Makers – Marlin Brinser 1978
- Dictionnaire Universel del Luthiers – René Vannes 1951, 1972, 1985 (vol.3)
- Universal Dictionary of Violin & Bow Makers – William Henley 1970
- Meister Italienischer Geigenbaukunst – Walter Hamma 1964
- Natale Gallini, Franco Gallini, Museo degli strumenti musicali, Milano, 1963.
- BISIACH, Giuseppe, detto Leandro, in Dizionario biografico degli italiani, Roma, Istituto dell'Enciclopedia Italiana. URL consultato l'11 marzo 2013
- Gli ultimi dei Bisiach di Paolo Fornaciari in Arte Liutaria n.10/88
