= Moshe Gildenman =

Jewish partisan during World War II

Moshe Gildenman (Yiddish: משה גילדענמאן; Russian: Моше Гильденман; 13 May 1898 – 10 August 1957), known as "Uncle Misha", was a Jewish partisan commander in Ukraine during World War II.

== Early life ==
Gildenman was born in Korets, in the Volhynia Governorate of the Russian Empire (present-day Ukraine). After attending a religious primary school, a secular secondary school, and a polytechnic institute, he became a construction engineer and the owner of a concrete factory. A leading figure in Korets's public life, he served as chairman of the Workers' Organization for 15 years and led the organization's People's Bank and Interest-Free Loan Fund. He was also active in leadership of the TOZ and CENTOS charitable organizations, as well as of the local orphanage. He was very involved in the cultural life of his hometown, conducting the school orchestra and chorus along with a mandolin ensemble he organized at the Tarbut school. He also conducted the choir of the Zionist youth group "Freiheit" and served as the director and composer for the Korets Yiddish Drama Lovers Circle.

== During the Holocaust ==
Korets was occupied by Nazi Germany on July 8, 1941. During an Aktion in Korets on May 21, 1942, the Nazis killed approximately 2,300 Jews, including Gildenman's wife and daughter. Gildenman appealed to the Jewish leaders to resist the Germans, but they would not listen. On September 24, 1942, as the Nazis were preparing to liquidate the Korets ghetto, Gildenman escaped to the forest to join the partisans with 11 other Jews, including his teenaged son Simcha.

Gildenman and his group traveled northward for about two weeks and added other Jewish refugees to their ranks. They set up camp in the swampy region of Polesia on the Belarus–Ukraine border. The group had originally left Korets with just two guns and a butcher knife, but stole additional weapons during battles, including two rifles they raided from a forest guard and six additional rifles, two pistols, and three hand grenades they plundered during an ambush on a group of policemen. With those weapons, they attacked Nazi collaborators, German farms, and headquarters of the Ukrainian Auxiliary Police.

In January 1943, Gildenman's group joined up with the partisan federation of Soviet General Alexander Saburov. Fighting under the nom de guerre "Uncle Misha", Gildenman established combat unit composed mostly of Jewish fighters, which became known as "Uncle Misha's Jewish Group". The group operated in the Zhytomyr Oblast, and is credited with destroying bridges over the Teteriv River and near Olevsk, blowing up a German movie theatre in Narowlya, and executing the German district commissar in Chopovychi. One of the members of Uncle Misha's Jewish Group was Mordechai Schlein, who is credited with blowing up a German restaurant in Ovruch.

After the Zhytomyr Oblast was liberated by the Red Army in October 1943, Kliment Voroshilov offered Gildenman a civilian engineering job, but Gildenman refused, explaining that he wanted to remain in the fight until victory. He completed officers training in Pavlovsk and served as a captain in the engineer corps until the end of the war. He was awarded several medals, including the Soviet Order of the Red Star and the Polish Order of the Cross of Grunwald.

== After the Holocaust ==
After the war, Gildenman settled in Poland, where he was active in the party of the progressive Zionists. He later relocated to Paris for several years before immigrating to Israel in 1951. He died of cancer in Ness Ziona.

Gildenman chronicled his adventures during the war in articles in Dos naye lebn [The new life], Iḥud [Unity], Al hamishmar [On guard], and Mosty [Bridges] in Łódź, Naye prese [New press] and Der veg [The way] in Paris. He also wrote for Di letste nayes [Latest news] in Israel and the Yidishe tsaytung [Jewish newspaper] in Buenos Aires. He published four books about his experiences as a partisan.

== Published work ==
- Ḥurbn Ḳorets. Paris: O.fg., 1949.
- Moṭele: der yunger parṭizaner. Paris: O.fg., 1950.
- Oyfn ṿeg tsum zig. Paris: Aroysgegebn durkh der organizatsye fun di Poylishe Yidn in Franḳraykh in [Paris], 1949.
- Yidishe ṭekhṭer. Paris, 1950.
