= Violins of Hope =

Collection of string instrument

- כינורות של תקווה
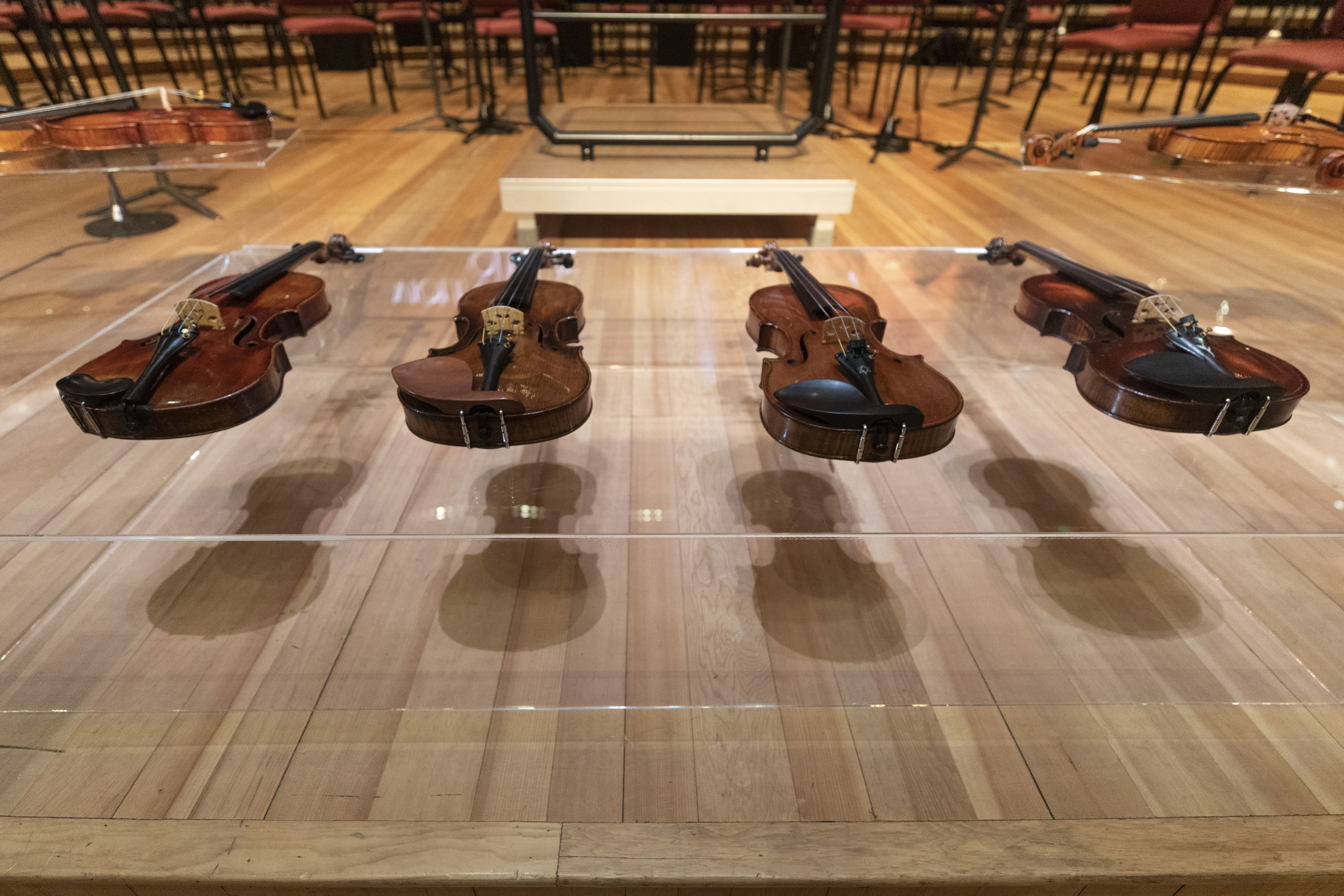
- Founder: Amnon Weinstein
- Type: Non-profit corporation
- Purpose: Education
- Location: Tel Aviv, Israel
- Region served: Worldwide
- Website: www.violins-of-hope.com

The Violins of Hope (Hebrew: כינורות של תקווה) is a collection of Holocaust-related string instruments in Tel Aviv, Israel. The instruments serve to educate and memorialize the lives of prisoners in concentration camps through concerts, exhibitions and other projects. The collection is owned by father and son team Amnon and Avshalom Weinstein, who are both violin makers.

== Concerts and exhibitions ==
In the first decade of the new millennium, Weinstein started to use the instruments of the Violins of Hope collection to initiate concerts combined with educational events teaching about the Holocaust.

Year	Location and Musicians
2008	Jerusalem, Israel: Symphonette Orchestra and the Istanbul State Symphony Orchestra with Shlomo Mintz
2010	Switzerland, SION International Music Festival. Exhibition of selected instruments and concert with Shlomo Mintz
2011	Madrid, Spain, concert on occasion of International Remembrance Day with Shlomo Mintz, Cihat Askin, Hillel Zori, Sander Sittig, Enrique Perez and Emilio Navidad Maastricht, Netherlands: concert with Amati Ensemble and photo exhibition
2012	Charlotte, North Carolina: extensive program at the UNC Charlotte with concerts, exhibition, film screenings et al.
2013	Monaco: Philharmonic Orchestra of Monte Carlo, conducted by Gianluigi Gelmetti, with Schlomo Mintz
2014	Rome, Italy Villa Musica, Neuwied: Exhibition and concerts with Gil Sharon and Elina Gurewitz
2015	Berlin, Germany: Exhibition and concert with the Berlin Philharmonic Orchestra, conducted by Simon Rattle Cleveland, Ohio: Exhibitions and concert with members of the Cleveland Orchestra, ongoing project
2016	Monterrey, Mexico: Concert with Esperanza Azteca Orchestra, conducted by Yoel Levi with Shlomo Mintz and Cihat Askin Houston, Texas
2017	Jacksonville, Florida: concert with members of the Jacksonville Symphony, part of a month long Anne Frank exhibit Sarasota, Florida: concert and exhibition London, England: concert and fundraiser Washington, DC, Library of Congress Bucharest, Romania: concert with, among others, Gil Sharon and Hillel Zori
2018	Cincinnati, Ohio: The Cincinnati Symphony Orchestra, conducted by Louis Langrée; The Cincinnati Chamber Orchestra conducted by Eckart Preu Dachau, Germany Nashville, Tennessee: Exhibition and concert Dresden, Germany Dortmund, Germany
2019	Knoxville, Tennessee: Exhibit and concert with Knoxville Symphony Orchestra Phoenix, Arizona: Exhibits and concert February through March Auschwitz, Poland: musical interludes were performed on selected instruments during the opening ceremony for the exhibition "Through the Lens of Faith"
2021	Richmond, Virginia: Exhibits and concert with the Richmond Symphony Reading, Pennsylvania: Exhibits and concerts with Reading Symphony Orchestra and local colleges
2022	Portland, Maine: Exhibits and concerts with the Portland Symphony Orchestra
2023	New Orleans, Louisiana: Exhibits and concerts with the Louisiana Philharmonic Orchestra and the National World War II Museum.

== See also ==
- List of Holocaust memorials and museums
- List of music museums
