= Ferdinando Garimberti =

Italian violin maker

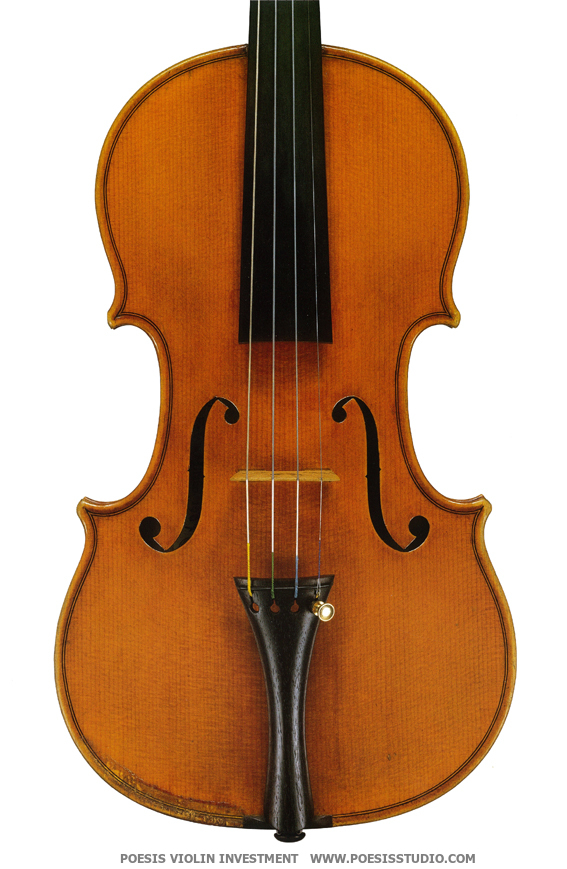
Ferdinando Garimberti Violin, Featured in the Ferdinando Garimberti Book, Front

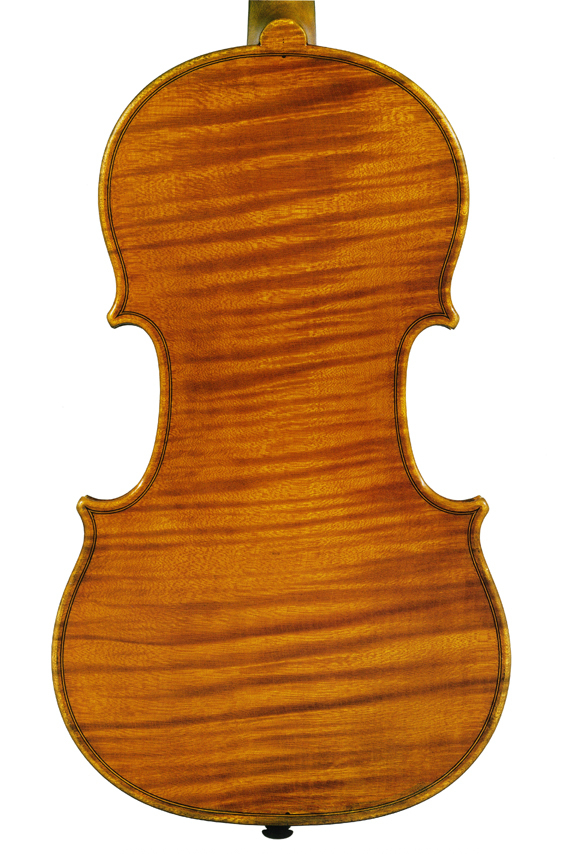
Ferdinando Garimberti Violin, Featured in the Ferdinando Garimberti Book, Back

Garimberti, Ferdinando (6 January 1894 – 26 March 1982) was an award-winning Italian violin maker.

== Biography ==
Garimberti was born in Mamiano di Traversetolo, a province of Parma, on 6 January 1894. In 1902, he and his family moved to Milan. He studied with Romeo Antoniazzi, then Riccardo Antoniazzi; he then worked for Giuseppe Pedrazzini and Leandro Bisiach, and later set up independently in Milan. Between 1927 and 1949 his instruments won important awards at the exhibitions held at Rome, Padua and Cremona, including the 1937 National Violin Making Exhibition and Competition in Cremona marking the 200th anniversary of Stradivari's death. He taught at the International School of Violin Making in Cremona from 1963 to 1966. He died in Milan in 1982 (at the age of 88).

During his long career, his models and style remained almost unvaried. His work is meticulous, very precise and clean, always extremely careful and very elegant. He was discriminating in his choice of wood and he clearly preferred to fashion the backs out of one piece. He applied the varnish with great skill; this varies in consistency and colour depending on the period. The most usual colour is a beautiful red-orange which sometimes becomes lighter towards the centre but is sometimes a darker red. He also did much repair work and was considered an expert in old Italian violins. He often marked his instruments with a signed label and a brand on the inside.

== Quotes ==
"Ferdinando Garimberti, was one of the most prestigious master luthiers of the late 1900s." - Giorgio Grisales

"Ferdinando Garimberti, along with Ansaldo Poggi and Giuseppe Ornati, are considered the top 3 modern Italian makers of the 20th century. Many soloists, past and present, own Garimberti and Poggi instruments as they function as good facsimile Stradivaris and Guarneris. As we have seen in the recent sold prices of instruments by Ferdinando Garimberti, Ansaldo Poggi, and Giuseppe Ornati, their investment potential is huge." Poesis String Studio & Violin Experts
