= Carlo Bisiach =

Italian violin maker

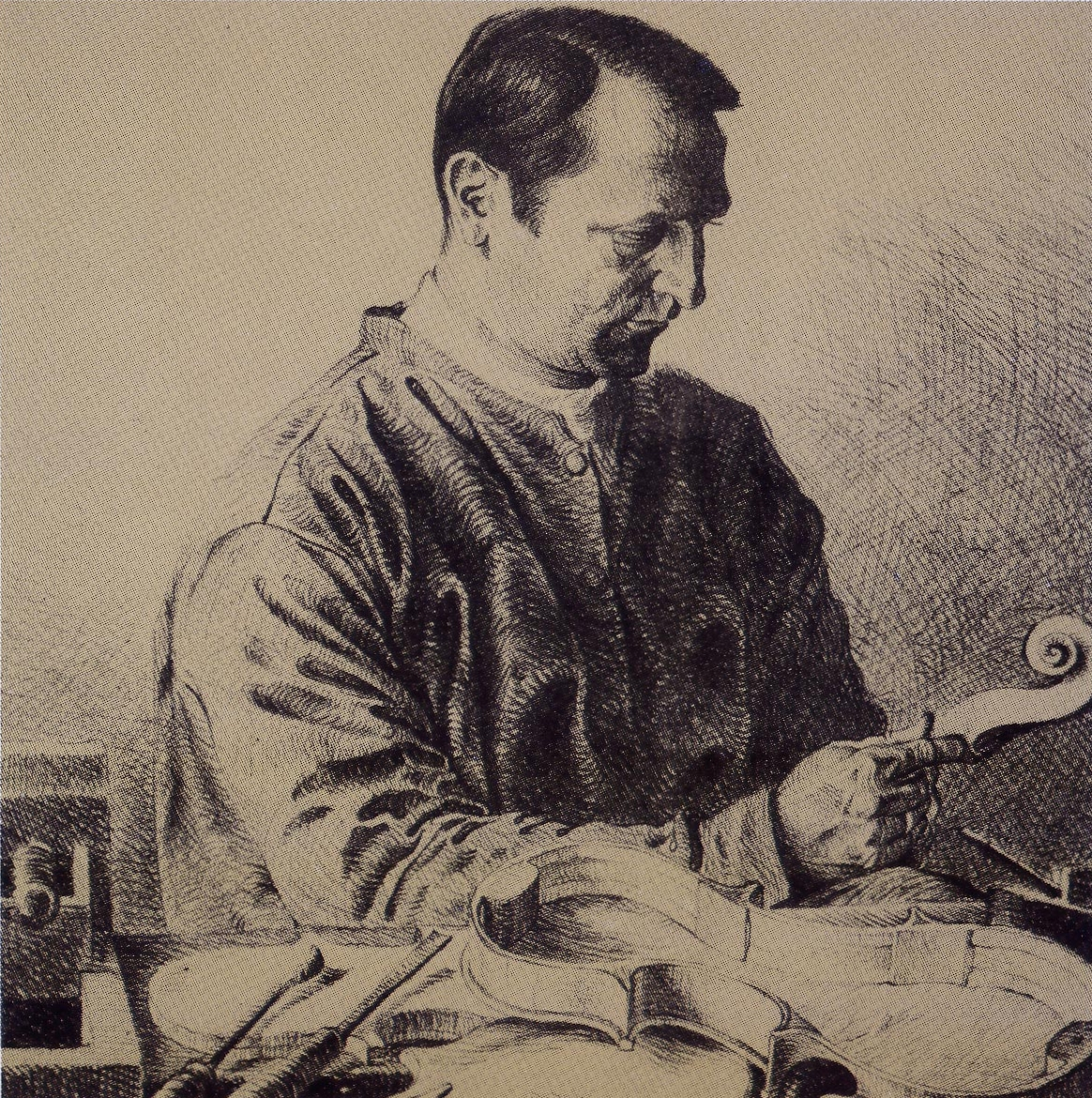
Carlo Bisiach, sketch portrait, in his atelier

Carlo Bisiach (9 March 1892 – 23 April 1968) was an Italian violin maker. Bisiach's work contributed to the rebirth of violin making in the region after the difficult times of World War I and World War II. After working with his father Leandro in Milan and then Siena, Carlo established himself at Florence in 1922. The most talented of Leandro's sons, Carlo went on to develop his own style, distinct from the Antoniazzi-derived work of his father and brothers.

== Biography ==
Carlo Bisiach was born in Milan on 9 March 1892 and died on 23 April 1968.

The son and student of Leandro Bisiach, descendant of the Cremonese school, he began studying the art of stringed-instrument making in the early years of his life. In 1922, after marrying Daria Guidi in Siena, he moved to Florence. They first lived in via della Spada; later they moved to via San Zanobi, and in 1929 to via Puccinotti. Here Bisiach lived for the rest of his life.

As a young man, Carlo studied cello with Giovanni Buti and for a time seriously considered a career as a performer. In 1906, at the age of 14, he along with his older brother Andrea (two years his senior), traveled to Mirecourt to study violin making with Leon Mougenot. Between 1909 and 1914, Carlo studied the art of bow making with Eugene Sartory in Paris, working alongside Andre Vigneron (1881–1924). Next, he traveled to Amsterdam where he spent several years in the workshop of Karel Van der Meer. Then spent close to a year in Germany until World War I, where he acquired a wealth of knowledge in restoration techniques and expertise in classic instruments establishing contacts with the top English and German dealers and experts.

With the outbreak of World War I, Carlo and Andrea returned to Italy for military service where to Carlo's fortune, they made use of his musical talents. He had been assigned to playing concerts for the troops, which included solo w/orchestra, orchestral music, chamber music as well as recitals with pianist Tullio Serafin (1878–1968), who was later to become an outstanding opera conductor.

== Siena years ==
By 1916, Milan was being bombed by Austrian Zeppelins, which brought a stop to most normal activities. With most of his pupils as well as his sons in the war, it was at this point that Leandro Sr. closed his Milan studio and moved to the safer and beautiful medieval city of Siena at the invitation of Count Guido Chigi-Saracini, and stayed there from 1916 to 1922, where he worked on restoring and building up the Counts collection by acquiring great examples of the best instruments. For several years, the Chigi-Bisiach studio attracted clients including famous concert artists from all over to have their instruments repaired, adjusted and appraised.

In 1917 Sderci was introduced to Leandro Bisiach by Don Fortunato (Sderci's brother) and Count Chigi Saracini. To Sderci's good fortune, he did not serve in the war owing to circulatory problems in his legs, a lifelong condition. Sderci had worked as a sculptor & carver for his uncles Tito and Giuseppe Corsini in Siena making richly decorated furniture, and then in a factory making ladies’ shoes, even designing some with removable heels. Recognizing his innate talent and needing an assistant, Sderci was taken on by Leandro. At the end of the war, when Carlo Bisiach joined his family in Siena, Igino was put under Carlo's guidance for training. Sderci excelled quickly as he was ardent about violin making.

Newly found archival evidence (from Milan and Siena as well as De Paolis family) shows that "Sderci worked with Bisiachs mainly in Siena, and the only recorded time he visited Milan was for the wedding of Bisiach's daughter Amina to Lorenzo De Paolis (famous cellist) in 1921 at their villa in Venegono Superiore, near Milan." Historical Archive of Siena points out that "Igino Sderci emigrated to Florence on August 14, 1926" (not earlier) - Archivio Storico del Comune di Siena. Hence Igino's early instrument Amatese Strad labeled ‘fecit in SIENA Anno 1924’.

By 1922, Leandro's work at Chigi Palazzo was completed and he returned to Milan, where he worked until his retirement around 1932. From 1921 to 1924 Leandro Jr. & Giacomo remained in Siena to study with Sderci, and shortly after Sderci had moved to Florence on August 14, 1926, as confirmed by Siena Historic Archives.

== Florence ==
Carlo Bisiach had met his love Daria Guidi (a concert pianist) while in Siena, married her in 1922 (he was 30 years old) and decided to make Tuscany his new home and moved to Florence. Once in Florence, Carlo first settled in via della Spada at the corner of via Tornabuoni. In 1923, his son Guido was born in November 1923. Two years later they had moved to via San Zanobi 49. By 1929, they moved to via Puccinotti 72 and subsequently to via Puccinotti 94, where Carlo lived for the rest of his life. In Florence he took on the position of a "conservationist/curator of Museum of the R. Conservatorio di Musica di Firenze (later Luigi Cherubini Conservatory of Music in Florence) which included the Medici Quartet made by Antonio Stradivari."

His instruments, though few in number, are constructed of high-quality materials and are said to produce excellent sound. After completing construction of an instrument, he would leave it for up to two years before varnishing it. He is known for the quality of his varnish and the technique used to apply it to his instruments.

An article on Bisiach states:

Unlike many modern makers, Carlo did not attempt to develop his own model. He was convinced that the classical masters of the 17th & 18th centuries had brought the violin to the peak of its formal and sonorous beauty and he was content to emulate them in so far as it was possible for him to do so. Among the makers whose works he copied were of course Stradivari, often the early Strad Amatise types, Guarneri Del Gesu, G.B. Guadagnini, Januarius Gagliano, Mantegazza, Tommaso Balestrieri, Andrea Guarneri, Pietro Guarneri of Mantua, Camillo Camilli as well as Gabrielli. But the model he admired most, both for its designing and tonal characteristics was that of Pietro Guarneri.

— Albert Mell, The Strad, (Vol. 84, No. 998)

== Achievements ==
Among his awards is a gold medal at XIII Exhibition, Padua. Represented with four violins at the prestigious exhibition-competition of modern violin making held in Cremona in 1937 on the occasion of Stradivari's bicentenary. In 1949, he won the diploma of honour at the exhibitions mounted at The Hague and in Cremona. Subsequently, he received numerous other prizes and recognitions.

His instruments are distinguished by the care taken in the selection of wood and their elegance of form. "A number of his instruments were made of maple cut from near the root of the tree. Wood from this area is often unpredictable in its marking and occasionally has a unique figure of extraordinary beauty."

Many distinguished artists owned Carlo Bisiach's instruments including Louis Kaufman (legendary American violin virtuoso), Franz von Vecsey, Edward Karkar, Maestro Saito of the Quartet of Tokyo and Dominique Pereira, concert violinist living in Bombay, India owned an Amatise Strad model circa 1923 then ordered a Guadagnini model as well.

World Record Auction Selling Price: Tarisio London, 24 June 2013 Carlo Bisiach violin Florence 1922 £39,000 ($60,240 USD)

Other recent auction results: Christie's NY #97 Apr-2008 Bisiach, Carlo Violin Florence, 1923 ($51,400 USD)

== Quotes ==
"Though an accomplished restorer and expert, violin making was his great love, and for this skill his fame is secure." - The Bisiach Family 1983, Philip J. Kass

"Carlo Bisiach did not (like most modern violin makers) try to, develop his own designs. He was convinced that the masters of the classic Cremonese school of the XVII and XVIII centuries had reached the height of perfection, in terms of elegance of form and fullness and softness of sound. He chose to be inspired by the masters, principally by Stradivarius during his «Amatise» period, but also by Guarnieri del Gesu, G.B. Guadagnini, and Gennaro Gagliano. However his preferred model was that of Pietro Guarnieri of Mantua." - Pardo Fornaciari

"Dario II Vettori - for the construction of his instruments he uses the moulds and models from his family's workshop, most of them originally belonging to Carlo Bisiach's collection, once owned by Igino Sderci. The wide variety of models employed in the Vettori's workshop is consisting of Guarneri "del Gesù", Pietro Guarneri da Mantova, Stradivari, Carlo Bergonzi, Camillo Camilli, Balestrieri, Nicolò Gagliano, Francesco Mantegazza, Domenico Montagna, Giuseppe Guarneri "filius Andreae" and many others." - Vettori family

"Resplended workmanship, often handsome slab backs and very fine grain for breasts, orange-red varnish. Gold medalist at various exhibitions" - Universal Dictionary by William Henley

"Among the greatest representatives of the Tuscan Lutherie of the early 20th century were undoubtedly Carlo Bisiach, his friend and pupil Igino Sderci and Dario Vettori." - Gualtiero Nicolini Liutai in Italia: dall'Ottocento ai giorni nostri 2008

"The finest new violins I have ever tried and I have played between 30 and 40 modern makers". - Oct. 1939 Isaac Stern

"Among the greatest representatives of the Tuscan Lutherie of the early 20th century were undoubtedly Carlo Bisiach, his friend and pupil Igino Sderci and Dario Vettori." - Gualtiero Nicolini Liutai in Italia: dall'Ottocento ai giorni nostri 2008

"Carlo Bisiach was a marvelous maker." - Albert Mell Journal of the Violin Society of America, Vol. II, No. 4

"His instruments are always painstakingly produced, the varnish is delicate and often of a red-brown color. They can be distinguished by means of the wood, which is selected with extreme care, for the smoother finishing and for the richness of the varnish, which reveals an optimum formulation which because of certain changes of color, makes the instrument seem old." Sesto Rocchi

== Awards ==
Carlo Bisiach's list of honors and awards:

- Gold Medal Certificate, XIII Industrial Exhibition, Padua 1931
- Citation of Merit, Stradivari Bicentennial, Cremona 1937
- Certificate of Honour, International Exhibition 1949
- and Concourse, Cremona violin listed N. 96 in Civic Museum
- Two Special Certificates, Concourse Hendrik Jacobsz Holland 1949
- Special Certificate, Accademia Nazionale Santa Cecilia, Rome 1952
- Certificate of Honour, National Exhibition and Concourse
- of Contemporary Violin Making Accad. Santa Cecilia, Rome 1952
- Certificate of Honour (same as above) 1954
- Gold Medal, National Exhibition of Violin Making, Ancona 1957
- Certificate of Honour, Exhibition of Violin Making, Cremona 1965
- Certificate of Honour (same as above) 1967

== Instruments ==
After working with his father Leandro in Milan, Carlo established himself at Florence in 1922. The most talented of Leandro's sons, Carlo went on to develop his own style quite separate from the Antoniazzi-derived work of his father and brothers.
