= Alfredo Antoniozzi =

Italian politician (born 1956)

Deputy of the Italian Republic
- Incumbent
- Assumed office October 13, 2022

Member of the European Parliament
- In office July 20, 2004 – July 1, 2014

Personal details
- Born: March 18, 1956 (age 70) Cosenza, Italy
- Party: Brothers of Italy (from 2018); DC (till 1994); FI (1994–2009); PdL (2009–2013); NCD (2013–2017); AP (2017); NcI (2017–2018)
- Education: Sapienza University of Rome
- Occupation: Politician

Alfredo Antoniozzi (born 18 March 1956 in Cosenza) is an Italian politician and was a Member of the European Parliament for Central with the Forza Italia, part of the European People's Party and sat on the European Parliament's Committee on Civil Liberties, Justice and Home Affairs.

He was a substitute for the Committee on Regional Development, a member of the Delegation for relations with the countries of Central America and a substitute for the Delegation to the EU-Mexico Joint Parliamentary Committee.

== Education ==
- 1980: Graduate in law
- 1981: started legal practice
- Coordinator of Forza Italia for the Provincial Council of Rome
- Rome City Council
- Lazio Region
- Re-elected member of the Regional Council in 1995 and in 2000 for Forza Italia

== Career ==
- 1995-1999: Member of the Bureau
- 2004: Group leader of Forza Italia until July
- Member of the Bureau of Forza Italia
- Forza Italia Coordinator for the Province of Rome

== See also ==
- 2004 European Parliament election in Italy
