= Annibale Fagnola =

Italian violin maker

Annibale Fagnola (1866–1939) was an Italian violin maker. He was born in Montiglio Monferrato, Italy, and in 1894 moved to Turin, where he worked until his death. His instruments today are prized for their beautiful craftsmanship and sonorous tone. He was largely self-taught, though may also have studied with Marengo-Rinaldi. Through beautiful copies of important violins by Guadagnini, Pressenda, Oddone and Rocca, he transmitted the tradition of the 18th and 19th Century Piedmontese masters and made it his own. He exhibited at Genoa and Milan in 1906 where he gained international recognition and his business blossomed. He gradually developed his own style, and made his best instruments during the 1920s.
