= Gaetano Antoniazzi =

Gaetano Antoniazzi (7 August 1825 – 1 August 1897) was an Italian violin-maker. He most likely learned his trade in Cremona in the workshop of Giovanni Battista Ceruti. He was active as a violin maker in Milan from 1870 to 1890. He was the father of violin makers Riccardo Antoniazzi and Romeo Antoniazzi. Violin maker Eric Blot stated in Grove Music Online that "[Gaetano Antoniazzi's] work is good, original and spontaneous, but not always very careful".
