= Leandro Bisiach =

Italian violin maker

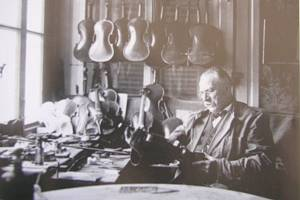
Leandro Bisiach in his atelier

Leandro Bisiach (16 June 1864 – 1 December 1945) was an Italian violin maker, who was born in Casale Monferrato and died in 1945 in Venegono Superiore near Varese.

== Biography ==
Trained as a violinist, he made his first violin on his own and received praise for it. Thus he decided to become a violin maker and moved to Milan to work with the Antoniazzi family in 1886. With them he established a partnership of exceptional importance, putting to good use his artistic skills and business ability. After having moved his workshop to various premises, he retired to his villa in Venegono leaving his sons Andrea and Carlo Bisiach to continue the business in Milan.

Bisiach was a prominent figure in the commerce of antique violins. He trained a number of luthiers, including Gaetano Sgarabotto, Igino Sderci, Pietro Borghi, Ornati and Garimberti.

His workshop can be considered the most important in Italy in that period. The following instrument makers worked at Bisiach's: Riccardo Antoniazzi, Romeo Antoniazzi, Gaetano Sgarabotto, Giuseppe Ornati, Ferdinando Garimberti, Igino Sderci, Rocchi Sesto, Carlo Carletti, Cipriano Briani, Camillo Mandelli, Ferriccio Varagnolo, Camillo Colombo, Vincenzo Cavani, Pietro Paravicini, Albert Moglie, Andrea Bisiach, Carlo Bisiach, Pietro Borghi, Mirco Tarasconi, Leandro Jr. & Giacomo Bisiach, Iginio Siega and Carlo Ferrario.

With the death of the last of the great Cremonese masters towards the end of the 18th century, only the Cerutis remained in Cremona. It was the Antoniazzis who undertook the task of transferring the scant knowledge saved from oblivion from Cremona to Milan.

Leandro Bisiach did a great deal of research and found some old recipes, which he used to create antiqued varnishes for the numerous copies he made. He primarily used a varnish of a light red-orange color although it varied greatly from one instrument to another. To give an instrument an aged look he very often shaded off the varnish only at the base of the back plate. Bisiach used a large number of diverse models but principally those of Stradivari, Amatise and other models of Guarneri, Balestrieri, Guadagnini, Gagliano, Enrico and Giovanni Battista Ceruti or other violin makers from Veneto in the 18th century. He also utilized many others as chance would have it.

Bisiach received various awards and recognition from exhibitions at Atlanta 1895-1896, Turin 1898, Paris 1900, Milan 1906 and Brussels 1910.

"The shaping of the back, in Bisiach's instruments, can be identified by the accentuated hollowing out that emphasizes the border, which is rounded. The inlay has a large central white strip and two very narrow black threads, short and slightly closed corners, an echo of the Stradivarian style. The F holes are cleanly and precisely cut, while the columns of the ribs are clearly inspired by the classic Cremonese school. Bisiach's varnishes, usually a beautiful red-brown, have brilliant yellow-gold reflections." - Pardo Fornaciari, Arte Liuteria

Musicians who owned Leandro's instruments included American violinists Sebastian Campesi and Nathan Milstein.

== Quotes ==
"The baron Andrea Paganini, grandson of the famous Niccolo, wrote a letter of thanks to Bisiach in 1839 for the repair in admirable style of his Stradivarius. Other clients included Sarasate, Joachim, and violoncellist Alfredo Piatti, who trusted his violoncello (a Stradivarius, from which Bisiach made a reproduction) to no one else. This patriarch of violin making must have had a rather striking personality, if his own maestro, Riccardo Antoniazzi, to say nothing of Antoniazzi's father Gaetano and brother Romeo, joined the company that Bisiach had created in his own name." - Pardo Fornaciari, Arte Liuteri

"Leandro Bisiach began in his native town of Casale Monferrato, in 1886, and immediately transferred himself to Milan where, as student of Riccardo Antoniazzi, thanks to Antoniazzi's maestro Enrico Ceruti (1803-1883) and of his teacher, Claudio Storioni, he could claim more than just an imaginary affiliation with the great Cremonese school. In fact Storioni had been a student of Carlo Bergonzi, the only true custodian of the secrets of Stradivarius. We must say that Leandro Bisiach honoured his significant inheritance, which in actuality was not only symbolic. By one of those tricks of fortune that make one suspect the hand of destiny, Leandro senior had come into possession of tools and models that had belonged to the various old Cremonese masters. This seems strange enough in itself, a curious coincidence. In reality, he had much greater luck; among the documents and papers obtained by Fanny Rossi, the widow of Giacomo Stradivari (1822-1901), Bisiach found the most precious and extraordinary item imaginable, that is, the formula for the varnish of the great Antonio Stradivarius from 1704. In truth, it was not the only varnish of the eighteenth century that Bisiach could use. He had at hand another formula used first by Giovan Battista Ceruti (1755-1817) and later by two other generations of the same family. In addition, in 1929 he gained possession of a collection of documents attributed to Stradivarius, among which he found another formula that dated back to the great Cremonese." - Pardo Fornaciari, Arte Liuteria

"Leandro Bisiach did a great deal of research and found some old recipes. The varnish on the instruments from his best period is very beautiful; of transparent and flexible quality. He primarily used a light red-orange color although it varied greatly from one instrument to another. He had a special talent for creating "antiqued" varnishes for the numerous "copies" he made. To give it the old look he very often shaded off the varnish only at the base of the back plate. He used a large number of diverse models but principally those of Stradivari, Amatise and other models of Guarneri, Balestrieri, Guadagnini, Gagliano, Ceruti or other violin makers from Veneto (Venice) in the 18th century. He also utilized many others as chance would have it." - Eric Blot

"Leandro was one of the most influential violin makers and dealers of the late 19th and early 20th centuries. He won important recognition and prizes in International exhibitions in London (1895), Atlanta (1895-96), Turin (1898), Paris (1900), Milan (1906), and Brussels (1910), and in 1905 opened and successfully ran a workshop that can be compared to the great workshops of J.B. Vuillaume and W.E. Hill and Sons." - Stefan Hersh

""One can easily say that Leandro was as influential in 20th century as J.B. Vuillaume was in the 19th century. Auction Record:Leandro Bisiach, Violin Milan 1895 Brompton's (London, England) Nov.3, 2008 $93,893 / £59,220" - Gennady Filimonov
