= Giovanni Battista Ceruti =

Italian violin maker

Giovanni Battista Ceruti (1756–1817) was an Italian violin maker, and is considered a direct link to the grand tradition of the Cremonese master violin makers of the 18th century. He is known for his violins, cellos and double basses.

== Biography ==
Born a generation after Antonio Stradivari and the Guarneri, with no direct link to the great tradition, violin making made an unlikely comeback in Cremona in the person of Lorenzo Storioni and his two followers, Giovanni Rota and Giovanni Battista Ceruti.

Along with Giovanni Rota, G.B. Ceruti was a follower of Lorenzo Storioni. He was born just outside Cremona and did not take up violin making until about age 40. It is said that he was probably self-taught, and his change of profession may have come through his colleagues in the textile trade, Bergonzi brothers, Nicola and Carlo II nephews of Michel Angelo Bergonzi, who did make a few violins.

Philip Kass states that Ceruti was sponsored by a nobleman, to the displeasure of the famous dealer and collector Count Cozio, who was promoting other makers, including Giovanni Battista Guadagnini and Giacomo Rivolta of Milan. Ceruti’s son Giuseppe and grandson Enrico carried on as the premier violin makers of Cremona until Enrico’s death in 1883. Ceruti Dynasty carried on the tradition from the times of Storioni.

Italy endured many wars, and finding materials for makers, at times was very difficult.

In 1802, he left Cremona and would take over Storioni's workshop. He died in 1817, most likely from typhus.
