= Giuseppe Ornati =

Giuseppe Ornati - (1887 in Albairate near Milan – 1965 in Milan) was an Italian violin maker or Luthier.

== Biography ==
Considered to be one of the greatest violin makers of his time, he trained as a carpenter and then received the first notions of violin making from the amateur maker Carlo Moneta. Towards 1903, he went to work at the workshop of Leandro Bisiach, where he stayed for some years working alongside Gaetano Sgarabotto. Distinguished from the outset by the skill and precision of his work, he made many instruments and carried out repairs for Bisiach until 1919, by which time he already had his own workshop.

A prize-winner at the competition of Rome in 1920 and in numerous exhibitions, he taught at the violin-making school in Cremona from 1961 to 1963. His production is characterized by accuracy and elegance.
