= Tommaso Balestrieri =

Italian luthier

- Born: c. 1735
- Died: c. 1790s
- Occupation: Luthier
- Years active: 1750s–1790s

Tommaso Balestrieri was an Italian luthier in Mantua, primarily active from 1750s to 1780s.

== Biography ==
Balestrieri's origin is not well established. His violin labels identify him to be from Cremona. He was born around 1735 and moved to Mantua later in life. His first known works were produced in Mantua and date to the mid-1750s, and his last works date to mid-1790s.

Balestrieri was one of the last masters of the Cremonese violin-making tradition – a tradition which had been established by four generations of the Amati family. It is not clear where or through whom Balestrieri acquired his craft. Other luthiers in Mantua whose works were rooted in the Cremonese Amati tradition were Pietro Giovanni Guarneri, Camillo Camilli, and Antonio Zanotti.

Balestrieri's early works were delicate and in line with the Amati tradition, but soon he started to incorporate more muscular and robust features in his designs – in line with Stradivari's designs. The materials used indicate an emphasis for performance over appearance. According to instrument maker John Dilworth, Balestrieri's works have a "full sound and forceful appearance (...) they may not be the most refined of violins in craftsmanship, but rival the very best in performance."
