= Camillo Camilli =

Italian luthier (c. 1704 – 1754)

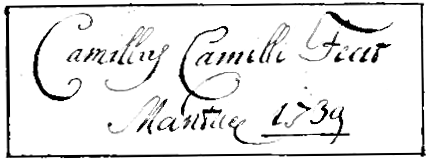

Camillo Camilli (c. 1704 – 1754) was a notable master luthier of the 18th century.

The instruments of Camilli, most of which he made in Mantua, Duchy of Mantua in northern Italy, are prized by string musicians to this day. He was a pupil of Zanotti, but was mainly influenced by Pietro Guarneri of Mantua, called the grandfather of Mantuan violin making. Guarneri's influence can be seen on the work of Camilli, particularly in the shape of the instrument, the purfling, and the way the notches of the f-hole are cut.
