= Riccardo Antoniazzi =

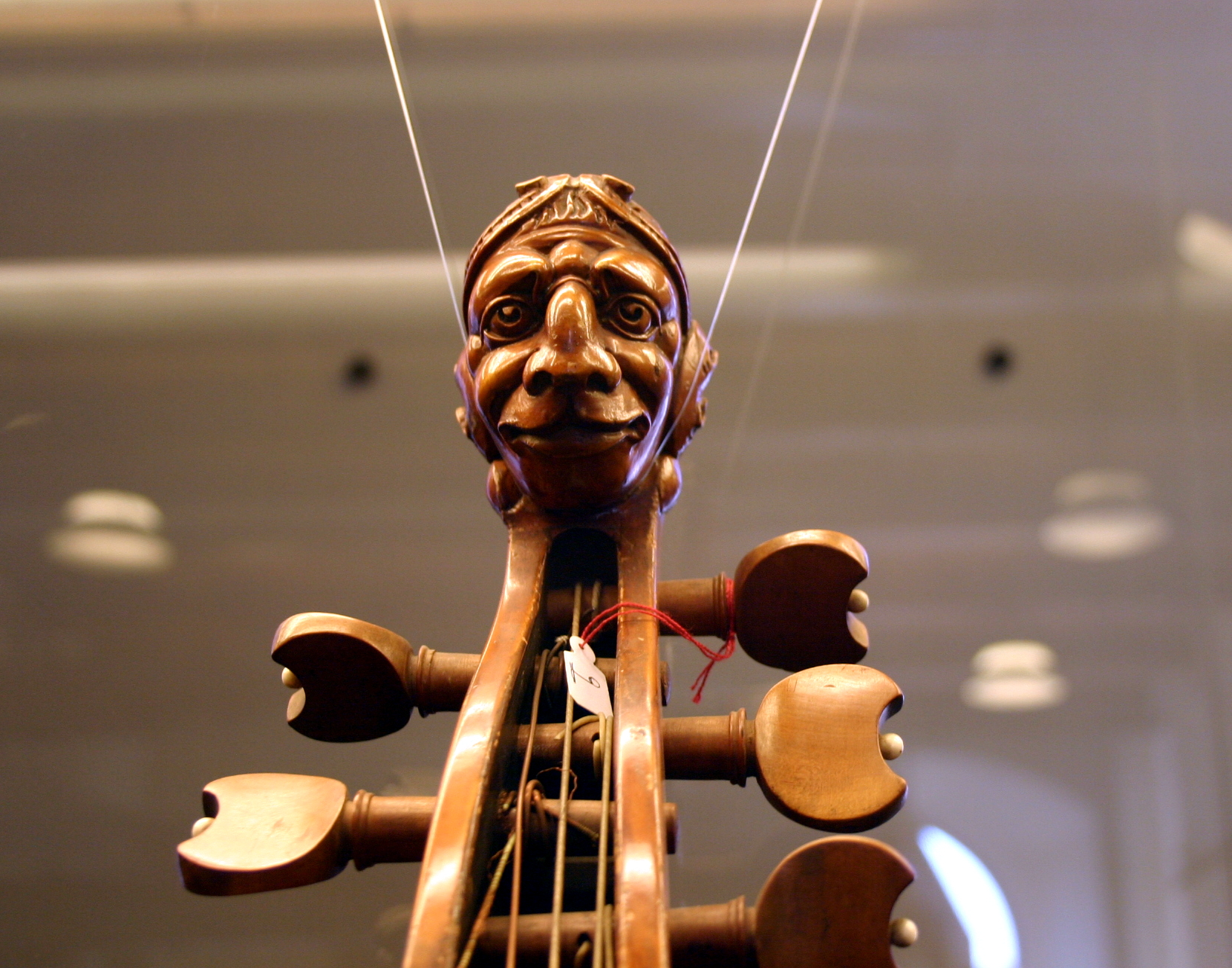

Riccardo Antoniazzi (19 December 1853 – 10 November 1912) was an Italian violin maker, the brother of Romeo Antoniazzi.

== Early life and career ==
Antoniazzi was born in Cremona, the sixth child and pupil of Gaetano and was the most consistent violin maker of his family. He lived somewhat in the shadow of Leandro Bisiach, and he did not sign many of the instruments from his best period.

His instruments can be divided into three periods: from his apprenticeship and early development until about 1887–8, during which he made instruments similar to those of his father; his best period, which lasted until about 1904, during which he developed his own style and worked primarily for Leandro Bisiach; and the period from about 1904 when he worked for the firm Monzino and Sons, during which he made beautiful instruments although working with less care, especially with regard to the varnish. Today these are his best-known instruments.

He used a great variety of models, and his varnish was yellow-orange or at times dark red. He is known to have used four different labels, and he also used a brand during his time with Monzino, with his initials A.R. inside a double circle surmounted by a cross. This brand is often attributed to Romeo, but it seems that he never used it.

== Death ==
He died in Milan.
