= Gaetano and Pietro Sgarabotto =

Italian luthiers

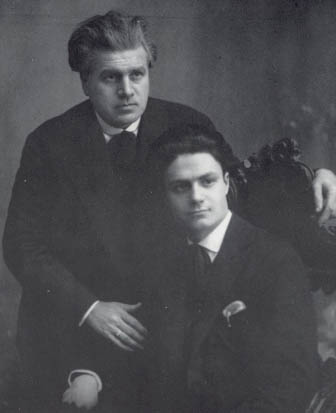
Gaetano and Pietro Sgarabotto in 1926

Gaetano Sgarabotto (1878–1959) and his son, Pietro Sgarabotto (1903–1990) were Italian luthier. The father made more than 700 violins, violas and cellos. The son was also a master violin maker. Both passed their experience in the craft to the next generations.

== Biographies ==
Gaetano Sgarabotto (1878–1959) was born in Vicenza, Italy. He devoted his entire career to violin making. He was a very prolific violin maker, making more than 700 instruments including violas and cellos. He earned a bronze medal for a violin as well as a silver medal for a quartet entry at the 1937 National Violin Making Exhibition and Competition in Cremona.

Gaetano S. worked initially in the city of Vicenza for many years before moving to Milan in 1901 to work for Leandro Bisiach. He moved to Parma in 1926, where he stayed almost without interruptions until his death in 1959.

His son, Pietro Sgarabotto (1903–1990), born in Milan, still produced masterworks as late as 1979; both worked for their entire lives in Italy as master violin makers.

Pietro continued in his father's profession and also became a master violin maker in his own right. Today one speaks within initiated circles with the utmost admiration of the brief, but prestigious dynasty of violin makers Sgarabotti. This refers to the historical presence of both these masters who, apart from creating their own master instruments, spent much of their time passing on experience to young violin makers. He retired in 1971.

== Work ==
The activity of the Sgarabotto makers was influential in the violin making school of Parma, Cremona and elsewhere. Their students and musicians playing their instruments held them in high esteem.

The works of both the Sgarabotto makers is characterised by their meticulous choice of materials, the workmanship always being "manual" in every phase of the process, and showing precision and loving care to detail.

While all Sgarabotto violin construction has been described as graceful, that of the father Gaetano said to be presenting a lighter touch whilst the graduation used by Pietro is more consistent. The sonority and general musical quality of their works lasts when being played.

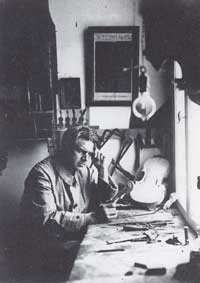
Gaetano Sgarabotto in his workshop 1929

== Quotes ==
Liuteria Parmense - In Parma, the 20th century tradition (of violin making) commenced with Gaetano Sgarabotto, who served his apprenticeship in the workshop of the Bisiachs, and can therefore be traced back to a Milanese origin.

After the death of the last great Cremonese Masters after the middle of the 18th century, only the Cerutis remained in Cremona to prevent the tradition from dying out completely. It was the Antoniazzis who undertook the task of transferring knowledge saved from oblivion from Cremona to Milan.

However the most important event for the renaissance of violin-making in Lombardy was certainly the meeting between Riccardo Antoniazzi and Leandro Bisiach; the latter, thanks to his talent, his taste and his business ability succeeded in founding, at the end of the 19th century, a workshop which soon gained international fame. Bisiach was an outstanding figure in the commerce of antique violins but above all had the merit of raising a generation of luthiers, among whom for example Sderci, Borghi, Ornati and Garimberti come to mind.

Gaetano Sgarabotto, another of Leandro Bisiach's pupils was born in 1878 in Vicenza; while still very young he had demonstrated a talent for violin-making. After his experience in Milan, Gaetano moved to Parma in 1926 and two years later was given the task of directing the School of Violin-Making which had been annexed to the Parma Conservatory.

The school concluded its experience after nine years, in 1937, but in the meantime had distinguished itself for the quality of its teaching. The proof of this is that luthiers such as Sesto Rocchi, Raffaele Vaccari and of course Gaetano's son Pietro were among its pupils. Gaetano was a most prolific and eclectic maker, and created instruments drawing inspiration from many different authors. Among this great variety of styles, his preferences were for the Amatis' models and Guadagnini forms. After the closure of the school Gaetano lived in Parma for long periods, from 1942 to 1948 and again from 1957 until his death in 1959.

His son Pietro, who was also a musician, lived and worked at length in Parma before being called to teach in the school of Cremona. For almost half a century, this experience of the first public School of violin-making seemed to have died out forever. But evidently the memory of this tradition was still alive because in 1975 the School returned to its place in the Conservatory under the direction of Renato Scrollavezza."

== Bibliography ==
- Gaetano e Pietro Sgarabotto-Liutai Violin Makers 1878-1990 Editrice TURRIS 1991 ISBN 88-7929-000-2

== External sources ==
- Liuteria Parmense
- Pietro Sgarabotto & David Oistrakh photo
