= Romeo Antoniazzi =

- Born: May 4, 1862; Cremona
- Died: May 7, 1925 (aged 63); Milan
- Occupation: Violin maker

Romeo Antoniazzi (4 May 1862 – 7 May 1925) was an Italian violin maker. He was the eighth son and pupil of Gaetano Antoniazzi. Antoniazzi was born in Cremona. Initially he worked with his father and brother and like them made instruments (of the violin family) for Leandro Bisiach. However, depending on need or opportunity he worked in many different places. He worked on his own, with his brother, for Bisiach, for Monzino, or in Barlassina’s shop.

The unsettled aspect of his life influenced his work which was highly uneven in quality. His most interesting instruments, like those of his brother Riccardo, are from the late 19th century. He trained a large number of pupils. Despite the fact that his violin making was less refined than his brother’s (especially during his last period), he made instruments with distinct personality and great spontaneity which today are much admired. His varnish varied in colour and quality depending on the period, going from a light orange-yellow to an orange-brown, sometimes dark brown (often the varnish of his last period faded and his instruments sometimes appear lacklustre). He used various labels. Later on he used one with ‘fece in Cremona’ and decorated with the Cremonese coat of arms on it even though he never returned to his native city to work (he probably introduced it for business reasons and to distinguish himself from his brother). He died in Milan.
