= Keith Peck =

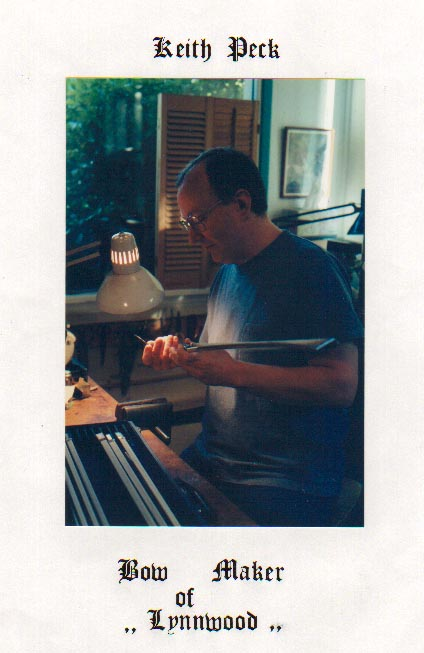
Keith Peck in his shop 1996

Keith M. Peck (1953–1998) was a highly acclaimed American bow maker from Evanston, Illinois. His bows are used on instruments such as those created by master makers Giuseppe Guarneri, Giovanni Battista Guadagnini, Giovanni Grancino, Jean-Baptiste Vuillaume, and many others.

== Biography ==
Peck began playing cello at age nine. He assembled his first cello when in junior high school. He spent two summers while in high school repairing string instruments for the Boise (Idaho) School District albeit living and going to high school in Moscow, Idaho. His father was a physics professor at the University of Idaho who researched and published extensively in the field of optics. Keith Peck moved to Seattle, Washington in 1975 and worked for David Saunders from 1975 to 1976. He was insistent on using the finest horse hair with even the most inexpensive bows.

Keith continued to study the cello with Howard Jones at University of Idaho. It was his other cello teacher, Arthur Ross, who got him intrigued in bows by stressing their importance and eventually his focus turned to bow making. He started making bows in 1971, and moved to Seattle, Washington in 1975 and worked for David Saunders from 1975 to 1976.

Peck established his own shop in 1976, making his own model, as well as copies of Dominique Peccatte, François Tourte, and Francois Nicolas Voirin. and frog copies of François-Jude Gaulard, John Dodd, Francois Lupot, Nicolaus Kittel, Pierre Simon, Voirin and many more. Peck is widely known for being the creator of the Amber Frog Bow, a bow commissioned by Gennady Filimonov.

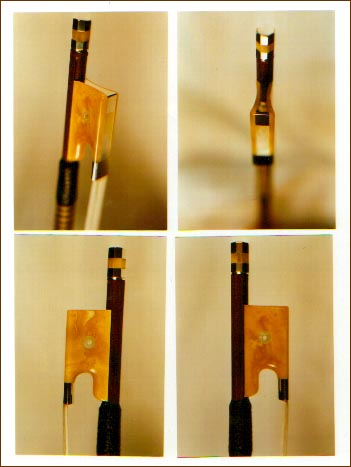
The Amber Frog bow by Keith Peck made in 1996/97 commissioned by Gennady Filimonov.

The Amber Frog / Picture bow (copy of F.N. Voirin), is the first documented amber frog bow (made in 1996–97), that was (and is) a complete success. It is still being played by Gennady Filimonov.

Amber used for the frog was Baltic amber. The amber frog and the rest of the bow was made entirely by hand by Master Bow Maker Keith Peck.

== Quotes ==
"...his bow was a perfect piece of work showing the right spirit of Vuillaume-Voirin. As for the owners of his bows, they should be honored to be in possession of such bows." - Jean Francois Raffin (1998) Bow Expert/Master Maker Expert Pres La Court D'Appel de Paris

"...seeing a Peccatte copy which he made, was one of astonishment..." - Elmar Oliveira Concert Soloist (1998)

"...superb copyist in the Great French Tradition..." - Bernard Millant (1998) Maitre Luthier-Archetier Entente Internationale des Maitres Luthiers et Archetiers d'Art
