= Jacob Eury =

French luthier and bow maker (1765-1848)

Jacob Eury (born 6 April 1765 in Mirecourt – died 7 October 1848) was a French luthier and bow maker. He was apprenticed in Mirecourt with his father as a violin maker, and later became an archetier / bow maker. According to the Paris census, he was noted having been in Paris as of 1792, where he certainly had some association with François Tourte. Throughout his life he moved many times and seems to have struggled financially. His work however never seems lacking. Top experts (such as E. Vatelot, Bernard Millant, J.F. Raffin, Paul Childs), agree that Eury's work is often compared to that of Tourte.

"Among Niccolò Paganini's bows were a Jacob Eury (Tourte model), Nicholas Duchaine c.1765, F. Tourte (later belonged to Partello collection), N. Lupot (Tourte model), a steel bow by J.B. Vuillaume which he endorsed and used often. His favorite bow was a Neapolitan bow (maker unknown, and a Tourte like model) made to his very strict specifications, which was broken in several places when it fell off the back of his coach on tour (as he was travelling in England towards Newcastle). Paganini had taken it to Jean-Baptiste Vuillaume for repairs as they were good friends. He went on to use this bow extensively." - Gennady Filimonov

== Bibliography ==
- Roda, Joseph (1959). Bows for Musical Instruments. Chicago: W. Lewis. OCLC 906667.
- Vatelot, Étienne (1976). Les Archet Francais. Sernor: M. Dufour. OCLC 2850939.
- Raffin, Jean Francois; Millant, Bernard (2000). L'Archet. Paris: L'Archet Éditions. ISBN 2-9515569-0-X.
- Dictionnaire Universel del Luthiers - Rene Vannes 1951,1972, 1985 (vol.3)
- Universal Dictionary of Violin & Bow Makers - William Henley 1970
- L'Abbé Sibire: La chélonomie, ou Le parfait luthier (Paris, 1806, repr. 1823/R, rev. 1885 by L. de Pratis)
