= Jean-Jacques Millant =

French bow maker

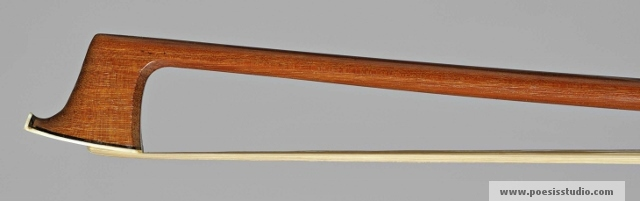
Violin Bow by Jean-Jacques Millant, Paris, Gold-Mounted, Head

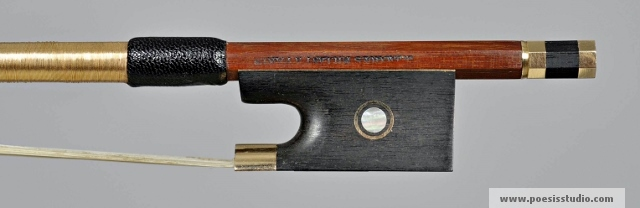
Violin Bow by Jean-Jacques Millant, Paris, Gold-Mounted, Frog

Jean-Jacques Millant (1928–1998) was an influential French bow maker/archetier (French word for maker of string instrument bows) of the Dominique Peccatte school. His cousin Bernard Millant (born 1929) produced bows similar in style. Millant, son of violin maker Roger Millant, was apprenticed in Mirecourt, Vosges, France by the Morizot Brothers from 1946–1948, then worked with his uncle, Roger and Max Millant in Paris until 1950, after which he opened his own shop in Paris.

In 1970, Millant was awarded the title Un de Meilleurs Ouvriers de France.

His bows, which are strongly influenced by François Peccatte and Dominique Peccatte, quickly enjoyed great esteem among the most highly demanding professionals. Millant made bows following the Peccatte pattern.

Stefan Hersch has commented that "Millant bows function much as good facsimile Peccattes. The combination of choice of materials, weight, strength, and flexibility make them excellent playing tools, and bows by this maker are becoming increasingly desirable in the market today and are sought after by top professionals."

Gennady Filimonov has stated that "Jean-Jacques Millant is considered one of the most important bowmakers of the latter part of the 20th century".

== Bibliography ==
- Stefan Hersh (Spring 2003). "A Brief History of the Bow as a Playing Tool". Sound Post. 3 (11). Archived from the original on 2007-09-21.
- Roda, Joseph (1959). Bows for Musical Instruments. Chicago: W. Lewis. OCLC 906667.
- Vatelot, Étienne (1976). Les Archet Francais. Sernor: M. Dufour. OCLC 2850939.
- Raffin, Jean Francois; Millant, Bernard (2000). L'Archet. Paris: L'Archet Éditions. ISBN 2-9515569-0-X.
- Vannes, Rene (1985) [1951]. Dictionnaire Universel del Luthiers (vol.3). Bruxelles: Les Amis de la musique. OCLC 53749830.
- William, Henley (1969). Universal Dictionary of Violin & Bow Makers. Brighton; England: Amati. ISBN 0-901424-00-5.
- Brueckner, Daniel - The Golden Bows / Der Goldbogen 2000 Edition Erwin Bochinsky.
