= Bow maker =

Person who makes bows for string instruments

A bow maker is a person who builds, repairs, and restores antique or modern bows for bowed string instruments. These include violins, violas, cellos, double basses, viola d'amore, viola da gamba, etc.

The French word for bowmaker (bow maker) is archetier, meaning one who makes bows of the string family of instruments such as violin, viola, cello and double bass. The root of the word comes from archet—pronounced [aʁʃɛ]—the bow.

== The bow ==
A bow maker typically uses between 150 and 200 hairs from the tail of a horse for a violin bow. Bows for other members of the violin family typically have a wider ribbon, using more hairs. White hair generally produces a smoother sound and black hair (used mainly for double bass bows) is coarser, producing a rougher sound. Lower quality (inexpensive) bows often use nylon or synthetic hair. Rosin, a hard, sticky substance made from resin (sometimes mixed with wax), is regularly applied to the bow hair to increase friction.

In making the stick of a bow, the initial part of the woodworking is done on a straight stick. According to James McKean, "the bow maker graduates the stick in precise gradations so that it is evenly flexible throughout." These gradations were calculated by François Tourte, discussed below.

In order to shape the curve or "camber" of the bow stick, the maker carefully heats the stick over a source of heat (such as an alcohol flame or a heat gun) a few inches at a time, bending the heated stick gradually to the proper shape. A metal or wooden template is often used to get the exact model's curve and shape while heating.

== History ==
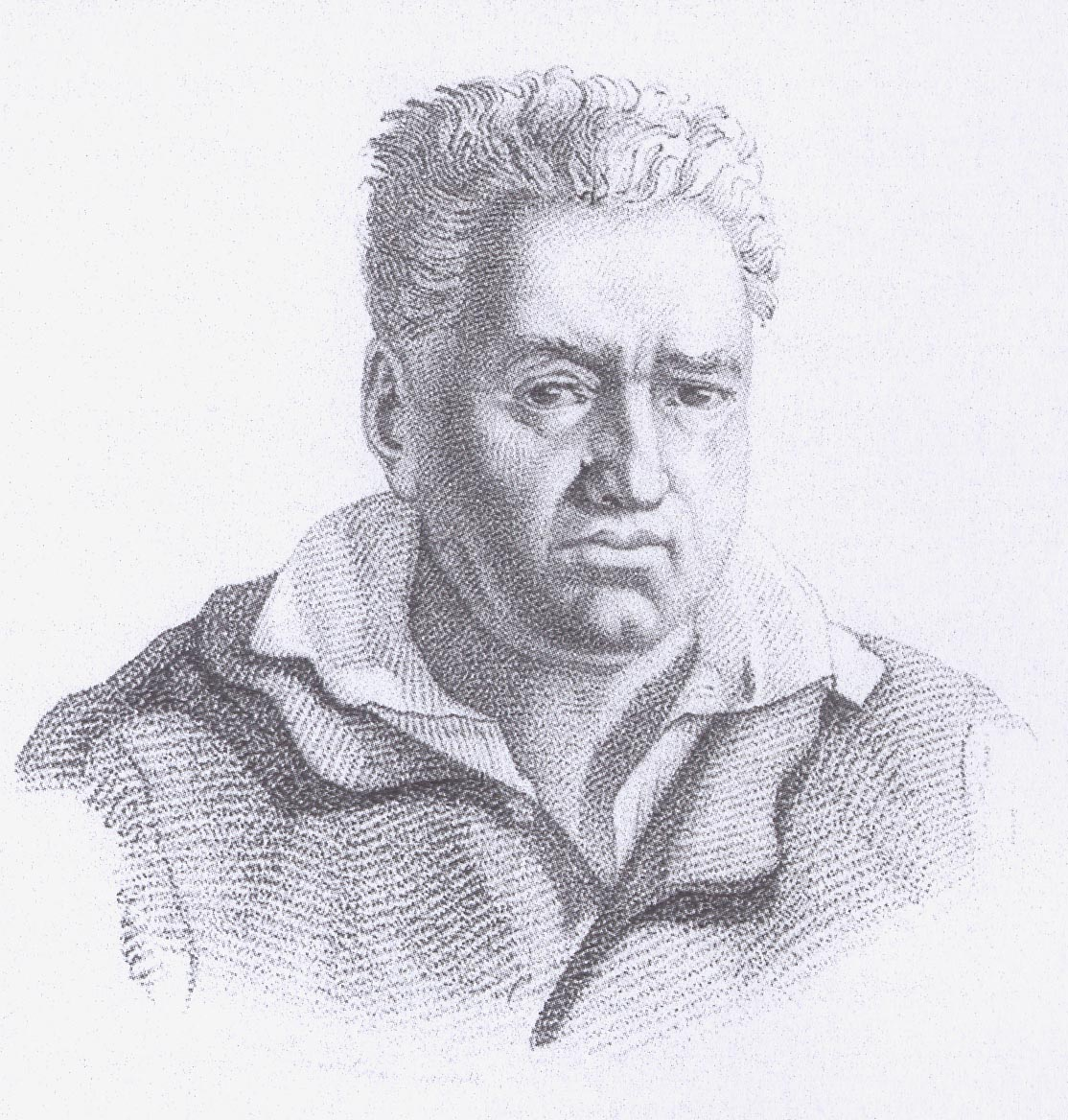
engraving of François Xavier Tourte 1818

Up until the standardization of the bow by François Tourte in 1785, most bows with rare exceptions remained anonymous (before 1750). And although François Tourte attained an enormous measure of fame in his own lifetime, the tradition of the anonymous bow maker was still so strong that theorists like Woldemar and Fetis called Tourte's new-model bow not the Tourte bow but the Viotti bow, after his contemporary the violinist.- David Boyden (After his father's death, Tourte, in collaboration with the violin virtuoso G. B. Viotti, made important changes in the form of the bow in the Classical period between 1785 and 1790. They lengthened them slightly, to 74 – 75 centimetres, and used more wood in the tip and a heavier nut.)

With the dawn of a new era in the introduction of the modern bow design by François Tourte, so too was the importance placed on the bow maker rather than the luthier to produce such playing tools.

The fact that bows are ascribed not to makers but to famous violinists (who were often composers as well) underlines the point that, with rare exceptions, bow makers remained anonymous before 1750. Quite probably the man who made the violin often made the bow or had it made in his shop: I have already indicated that Stradivari almost certainly made bows or had them made for him. After 1750, some makers began to identify themselves by stamping their names on bows-generally on the stick, sometimes on the frog, occasionally on both (as in some Dodd bows). Tourte pere, whom we now believe to be Louis Tourte, stamped a few bows c 1750 with the distinctive TOURTE-L but Francois Tourte (his more famous son), whose first standardized bows date from c 1785, rarely stamped his.

Although Francois attained an enormous measure of fame in his own lifetime, the tradition of the anonymous bow maker was still so strong that theorists like Woldemar and Fetis called Tourte's new-model bow not the Tourte bow but the Viotti bow, after his contemporary the violinist.

— David Boyden

== Quotes ==
"Giovanni Battista Viotti, the 18th- century violin virtuoso who is rumored to have consulted with Tourte on the bows formulation, to declare: Le violon, c’est l’archet - the violin, it is the bow. ... The bow is so crucial that much of the music of Beethoven, Brahms and Schubert and their musical heirs would not be performable without it...."

"The French bow maker François-Xavier Tourte, more commonly known as François Tourte or Tourte le jeune, is often referred to as "the inventor of the modern bow," or "the Stradivari of the bow." His bows, dating from the end of the eighteenth century and the early decades of the nineteenth, had a marked effect upon the timbre of violins and upon performance practice, enabling new forms of expression and articulation to be developed, and in particular, facilitating the increased use of legato. François Joseph Fétis's entry in the second, expanded edition of his Biographie universelle des musiciens et bibliographie générale de la musique (1860–65) has until recently been the only source of biographical information about François Tourte. Some thirty documents recently discovered in French archives provide further fresh insight into this maker's life and work." Stewart Pollens, Metropolitan Museum of Art, New York

"Tourte - French family of bowmakers and luthiers. It comprised of Nicolas Pierre Tourte and his sons Nicolas Léonard and François Xavier and perhaps Charles Tourte, son of Nicolas Léonard. In addition, a least two channelled (canalé) bows dating from about 1750–60 exist bearing the brand-stamp A.TOURTE." - Paul Childs

== Bow makers ==
- Jean Adam (bow maker)
- Bazin Family
- François Xavier Bazin
- Arthur Bultitude
- John Dalley (bow maker, violinist Quarneri String Quartet)
- Fétique (bow makers)
- Jules Fétique
- Marcel Gaston Fétique
- Victor Fétique
- Nicolaus Kittel
- Heinrich Knopf
- Joseph Alfred Lamy
- Marcel Lapierre
- Giovanni Lucchi (bow maker, founder of Italian School of Bowmaking and inventor of the LucchiMeter)
- Nicolas Maline
- Jean Joseph Martin
- Louis Morizot
- Jean-Jacques Millant
- Bernard Ouchard
- Etienne Pajeot
- Charles Peccatte
- Dominique Peccatte
- François Peccatte
- Keith Peck
- Jean Pierre Marie Persois
- Andre Richaume
- Eugene Sartory
- Pierre Simon
- François Tourte
- James Tubbs
- Andre Vigneron
- Joseph Arthur Vigneron
- Vigneron (bow makers)
- François Nicolas Voirin
- Jean-Baptiste Vuillaume

== Bibliography ==
- François-Xavier Tourte - Bow Maker by Stewart Pollens and Henryk Kaston with M.E.D. Lang, 2001 (Tourte's background, his working life and bow-making techniques.)

== See also ==
- Bow (music)
- Musical bow, musical instrument
- Pernambuco
- Playing the violin, section on "Bowing techniques"
- Rosin
- String instrument, section on "Bowing"
