= Rembert Wurlitzer Co. =

American musical instruments firm

Rembert Wurlitzer Co. was a distinguished firm in New York City that specialized in fine musical instruments and bows.

Rembert Rudolph Wurlitzer (1904–1963), violin expert and a grandson of the founder of Cincinnati’s Wurlitzer Co. (pianos, organs, jukeboxes), bowed out of the family firm in 1949 to found Manhattan's Rembert Wurlitzer Co., which has bought, sold, authenticated and or restored more than half the world's 600 known Stradivariuses, and supplied instruments to Fritz Kreisler, David Oistrakh and Isaac Stern among others.

"Wurlitzer had built up a first-class workshop inviting the great Simone Fernando Sacconi and his pupil Dario D'Attilli, where many of the best American repairers were trained. In his last years Sacconi spent much time teaching in Cremona, Italy, and published I segreti di Stradivari (Cremona, 1972), setting out in detail Stradivari’s working methods."

They amassed a very important collection of the finest instruments (of the violin family) which included Antonio Stradivarius, Giuseppe Guarneri, Domenico Montagnana, Sanctus Serafin, Lorenzo Storioni, Francesco Ruggeri, Joannes Baptista Guadagnini, Nicolas Lupot, J. B. Vuillaume to name a few, as well as an important fine bow collection including bows by François Tourte, Dominique Peccatte, Nicolaus Kittel, Jean Pierre Marie Persois and many others. Most importantly was the acquisition of the Henry Hottinger Collection in 1967.

"He (Henry Hottinger) had an early interest in the violin, and bought his first Stradivari in 1935. His ambition after the war was to acquire one outstanding example of each of the old Cremonese masters, and in the case of Stradivari and Guarneri ‘del Gesù’, one example from each significant period of their production. An illustrated catalogue (R. Wurlitzer: The Henry Hottinger Collection, 1967) was published following the collection's sale to Rembert Wurlitzer Co. (the most highly regarded string instrument dealership of its day). The instruments (about 30 violins in all) were subsequently dispersed all over the world."
