= François Nicolas Voirin =

French luthier

François Nicolas Voirin (1833–1885) was a French archetier (bowmaker), known in his time as the "Modern Tourte."

F.N. Voirin (the son of a gardener) was born in Paris, the brother of Joseph Voirin (also a talented bowmaker) and cousin to Jean Baptiste Vuillaume. At the age of 12, he served his apprenticeship in Mirecourt, with Jean SIMON, brother of Nicolas SIMON, also known as SIMON FR, and later worked in the workshop of Vuillaume from 1855 to 1870 where he succeeded Nicolas Maline and revolutionized bow design and construction.

After his tenure at the Vuillaume shop, he established his own business at 3 rue du Bouloi, Paris, where he worked until his sudden death. He was a prolific maker and is generally regarded as the most important bowmaker of the second half of the 19th century. His bows are of superb quality. Voirin produced a radically different bow from François Tourte; Slimmer head; the camber moved closer to head, yielding a stronger stick and reducing the thickness of the shaft especially at the heel. Primarily, Voirin made bows with the Vuillaume-style frog, many of these being 'picture bows', incorporating a miniature portrait and a magnifier. The micro-photos of Vuillaume were placed mainly in bows by Voirin, and made more visible using a Stanhope lens.

Voirin taught Charles Peccatte (1850–1920), son of François Peccatte as well as others including Joseph Alfred Lamy also known as Lamy père, Louis and Claude Thomassin, and Charles Nicolas Bazin.

Voirin was one of the great makers of the 19th century along with his predecessors François Tourte, Dominique Peccatte, Jean Pierre Marie Persois, and Etienne Pajeot.

Though the earlier bows of Voirin were stamped with the Vuillaume brand, his later work bears his own stamp, F.N.Voirin.

== Quotes ==
"François Nicolas Voirin has had a lasting effect and influence over many generations of bowmakers.

"His bows have been used by the greatest soloists, among them Jean-Delphin Alard, Charles Dancla, Eugène Ysaÿe, Mischa Elman, Jacques Thibaud, Isaac Stern, Emanuel Feuermann, Pinchas Zukerman, William Primrose and today Jian Wang and Viktoria Mullova." — Gennady Filimonov.

"François Nicolas Voirin was the most skilled maker of his generation, one of the finest makers ever, and he produced a uniformly high quality product...The best Voirin bows are exquisite playing tools; they are strong and nimble and produce a beautiful tone. By 1880 many makers were beginning to consistently aim for an even heavier, stronger model, with varying degrees of success. Lamy père picked up where Voirin left off." — Stefan Hersh 2003.

== Sources ==
- Stefan Hersh (Spring 2003). "A Brief History of the Bow as a Playing Tool". Sound Post. 3 (11). Archived from the original on 21 September 2007.
- Roda, Joseph (1959). Bows for Musical Instruments. Chicago: W. Lewis. OCLC 906667.
- Vatelot, Étienne (1976). Les Archet Francais. Sernor: M. Dufour. OCLC 2850939.
- Raffin, Jean Francois; Millant, Bernard (2000). L'Archet. Paris: L'Archet Éditions. ISBN 2-9515569-0-X.
- Les Luthiers Parisiens aux XIX et XX siecles Tom 3 "Jean-Baptiste Vuillaume et sa famille - Sylvette Milliot 2006
- Vannes, Rene (1985) [1951]. Dictionnaire Universel del Luthiers (vol.3). Bruxelles: Les Amis de la musique. OCLC 53749830.
- William, Henley (1969). Universal Dictionary of Violin & Bow Makers. Brighton; England: Amati. ISBN 0-901424-00-5.
- François Nicolas Voirin, the master of the light violin bow: notes on his life and work
- Violins & Bows - Jost Thoene 2006
