= Vigneron (disambiguation) =

Vigneron may refer to:

- Allen Henry Vigneron (born 1948), archbishop of the Roman Catholic Church in Detroit, Michigan
- André Vigneron (1881–1924), French bowed string instrument maker
- Joseph Arthur Vigneron (1851–1905), French archetier and bowmaker
- Marcel Vigneron, American chef
- Pascal Vigneron (born 1963), French organist and trumpeter
- Pierre-Roch Vigneron (1789-1872), French painter
- Thierry Vigneron (born 1960), retired French athlete
- Vigneron (bow makers), family of French bow makers
- Vigneron submachine gun, a submachine gun manufactured in Belgium during the 1950s
- Vigneron, the process of wine production
