= August Barbé =

Auguste Barbé (1853-1902) was a French archetier (bowmaker).

== Life ==
Mathias Théophile Auguste Barbé, son of Dominique Barbé and first cousin of Télesphore Barbé, completed his apprenticeship in Mirecourt, presumably under C.N. Bazin, as did many of his contemporaries.

Around 1880 Barbé began to work for Gand & Bernardel frères before joining their Parisian workshop in 1886, the year during which the firm became Gand & Bernardel. Barbé spent 10 years with this important and influential firm, developing a style which came close to that of François Nicolas Voirin.

In around 1896/1897 Barbé returned to Mirecourt where he opened his own workshop at 1 rue Chanot.

"His work is highly praised, and admired by professionals and collectors alike. His best work has been mistaken for François Nicolas Voirin, it is that good." - Gennady Filimonov 2013
