= John Dodd (bow maker) =

British bowmaker (1752–1839)

John Dodd (1752 in London – 1839 in Richmond, Surrey) was a British bowmaker. He was considered to be the greatest English bowmaker before and until James Tubbs.

He was a gunlock fitter and then a money scale maker before turning to bow making. John Dodd was a contemporary of François Tourte and worked in London. He arrived at a similar bow design to Tourte, though entirely through independent means.

Bows made by Dodd are judged to be of a fine quality, but the measurements and characteristics of his bows are not entirely consistent over time. For example, some bows were made slightly shorter than the norm. His later bows are particularly fine, though judged to be a little short. The celebrated 20th-century violist, Lillian Fuchs, owned a fine viola bow which sold in May 2014 for $22,800 at Tarisio Auctions.

Though Dodd was often in dire need of funds, it was recounted that he was very secretive about his art, and once turned down an offer of 1000 pounds sterling for a copy of his pattern. He also refused to teach pupils for the same reason. Dodd used two forms for the head; the slender "swan" type and the squat "hammer"-head type, more common in Italy and France.

An excellent choice of Pernambuco wood was available to Dodd and much of this came to England in the form of barrels. This explains the numerous traces of nail holes which sometimes run right through his sticks.

According to Pierre Baillot, it seems that Viotti may have used a Dodd bow which was about 2½ cm shorter than the Tourte model.

Dodd had the innovative idea of using double saws to cut the curve of the bow directly out of a plank of wood, rather than bending a straight bow with heat to achieve the curvature. While this method creates a bow that draws an excellent tone, it lacks the ability to bounce off the string that the classical method supports.

He died, in extreme poverty, in Richmond workhouse on 4 October 1839.

== Sources ==
- Bows and Bowmakers - W.C. Retford 1964
- W.E. Hill & Sons (A Tribute)- Richard Sadler 1996 ISBN 0-9504357-2-4
- Roda, Joseph (1959). Bows for Musical Instruments. Chicago: W. Lewis. OCLC 906667.
- Dictionnaire Universel del Luthiers - Rene Vannes 1951,1972, 1985 (vol.3)
- Universal Dictionary of Violin & Bow Makers - William Henley 1970
