= Bernard Ouchard =

French archetier / bowmaker (1925 - 1979)

Bernard Ouchard (15 February 1925, in Mirecourt – 2 June 1979, in Vittel) was a French master bow maker and teacher in the School of Violin and Bowmaking of Mirecourt, France. He is considered by some to have been the last historical French master bow maker.

Bernard Ouchard was the son of Émile Auguste Ouchard and the grandson of Émile François Ouchard, both famous bowmakers. He learned his craft from his father and later worked for Vidoudez (a violinmaker of international repute) in Geneva. He was asked to return to France and give a new impetus to the revival of the French tradition(s) of bow making. He became the master bowmaker and teacher in the School of Violin and Bowmaking of Mirecourt, France.

"Bernard, (b. 1925) son of E. A. Ouchard, became his pupil, and worked with Vidoudez in Geneva before being appointed professor of bow making at the Mirecourt school in 1971, giving rise to the New French School which has produced such luminaries as Benoît Rolland, Jean-Yves Matter, Stephane Muller, Martin Devillers, Gilles Duhaut, sylvie Masson, Christophe Schaeffer, Jean Grunberger, Georges Tepho, Jacques Poullot, Eric Grandchamp and Stephane Thomachot. Most notable of the younger generation has been trained by the students of Bernard Ouchard like Edwin Clement, Sylvain Bigot, Gilles Nehr and Yannick LeCanu.

== Bibliography ==
- Roda, Joseph (1959). Bows for Musical Instruments. Chicago: W. Lewis. OCLC 906667.
- Vatelot, Étienne (1976). Les Archet Francais. Sernor: M. Dufour. OCLC 2850939.
- Raffin, Jean Francois; Millant, Bernard (2000). L'Archet. Paris: L'Archet Éditions. ISBN 2-9515569-0-X.
- Dictionnaire Universel del Luthiers - Rene Vannes 1951,1972, 1985 (vol.3)
- Universal Dictionary of Violin & Bow Makers - William Henley 1970
