= James Tubbs =

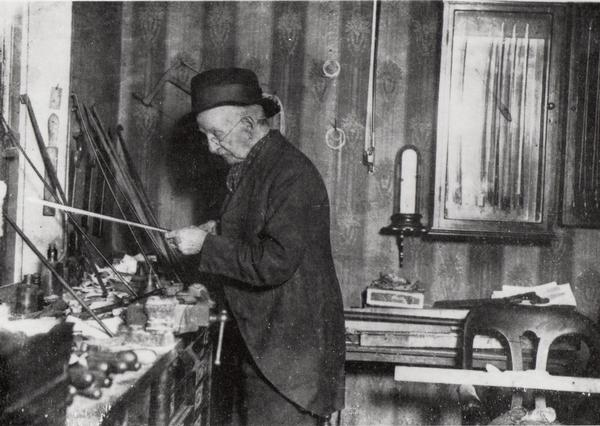
James Tubbs at his workbench in the shop at 94 Wardour Street, London. The photo taken in 1917 in his last years.

James Tubbs (1835 – 1921) is one of the most celebrated English bow makers, and is considered "The English Tourte".

Together with his son Alfred (d. 1912), he produced more than 5,000 bows. It is generally accepted that James Tubbs ranks among the five or six most important bow makers in history. "The Tubbs family made bows and instruments as early as the 1800s, and five generations have practiced the craft".

== Early life ==
Born in London in 1835, the eldest of eleven children and son of William, James Tubbs worked for his father until 1860.

== Career ==
Tubbs first started making bows for William Ebsworth Hill around 1860 and continued that relationship until 1870. His bows made for W. E. Hill & Sons are stamped W E Hill and are sometimes double stamped. In the 1870s Tubbs settled on his own opening a shop at 94 Wardour Street. The early bows from this period were branded "J. TUBBS." Around 1878 he changed this brand to "Jas. TUBBS."

In 1885 he won a Gold medal for his bows at the Inventions Exhibition held that year in London, after which he was made bowmaker by Special Appointment to Prince Alfred, Duke of Edinburgh.

== Legacy ==
In the widely cited book Universal Dictionary of Violin & Bow Makers, William Henley calls Tubbs "this champion" and places him alongside Tourte, Peccatte and Voirin.

String players generally regard his bows as extremely desirable, and will often go to great lengths to obtain one and collectors may pay huge amounts to own one.

"Leading musicians of the day such as Piatti and Wilhelmj, were attracted by bows made by James Tubbs and were using them. Since then, his bows have been enjoyed and used by musicians (soloists, chamber musicians and orchestral players) the world over."

== Typical characteristics of his work ==
Head is broad and full, the model being an early work of Francois Tourte. The frog with pearl eyes and long ferrule and one piece long buttons with solid metal (ex: silver ) are also typical of this period. Finest examples have metal fittings of engraved gold.

== Auction price ==
In 1995 a bow by Tubbs was sold at Sotheby's auction house for $43,608, a record price for one of his bows.
