= Nicolas Maline =

French luthier and archetier/bow maker (1822–1877)

Nicolas Maline (28 February 1822 – 28 April 1877 in Mirecourt) was a luthier and an archetier (bow maker).

He was apprenticed in Mirecourt and worked for Etienne Pajeot, J.B. Vuillaume and other makers. Maline came from a family of luthiers including his father Guillaume Maline (long considered to be the bowmaking Maline). In his early work, Maline initially followed the Pajeot example/style, but later in his career followed a very different direction on the basis of what was soon to happen in Paris (D. Peccatte's influence with the "hatchet-shaped" type head).

Nicolas Maline came as a very young man to Jean Baptiste Vuillaume, around 1840. Most of Maline's best work was sold by the firm of VUILLAUME and bears the latter's brand. His bows of this period reflect the Dominique Peccatte school ("hatchet-shaped" type head). He also made some self-rehairing bows, but also many bows using VUILLAUME-style frogs (round-edged ferrules). According to Bernard Millant and Jean-François Raffin, N. Maline certainly was first to use this style. Among his pupils were his son Nicolas Auguste Eugène Maline and Jean Joseph Martin.

"One of history's important bowmakers. His successor was François Nicolas Voirin. Maline's bows are among the most recognizable of the finest 19th century French bows." - Gennady Filimonov

== Sources ==
- Milliot, Sylvette (2006). Les Luthiers Parisiens aux XIX et XX siecles. Vol. Tom 3 "Jean-Baptiste Vuillaume et sa famille". ISBN 9782930130156.
- Raffin, Jean Francois; Millant, Bernard (2000). L'Archet. Paris: L'Archet Éditions. OCLC 47152342.
- Roda, Joseph. Bows for Musical Instruments (1959). Chicago: W. Lewis. ISBN 2-85955-002-X. OCLC 906667.
- Thoene, Jost: Violins & Bows - 2006
- Vannes, Rene (1985) [1951]. Dictionnaire Universel del Luthiers (vol.3). Bruxelles: Les Amis de la musique. OCLC 53749830.
- Vatelot, Étienne (1976). Les Archet Francais. Sernor: M. Dufour. OCLC 2850939.
- William, Henley (1969). Universal Dictionary of Violin & Bow Makers. Brighton; England: Amati. ISBN 0-901424-00-5.
