= Pierre Maline =

French luthier and archetier / bowmaker (1883 - 1934)

Pierre Maline (b. 1883 –d.1934) in Mirecourt (Vosges) was a luthier and an archetier / bow maker.

Son of François Alexandre Maline (1862–1922) a bow maker, who was the nephew of Nicolas Maline ("One of history's important bowmakers.").

Pierre Maline (grandnephew of Nicolas Maline) apprenticed first with his father before joining Eugène Cuniot-Hury's workshop. After his apprenticeship he returned to his father's workshop in Mirecourt where he stayed for the rest of his career (as well as his life).

His work is quite rare. Many of his bows were stamped PIERRE MALINE. Some of his production can be found unsigned or bearing the stamp of other violin & / or bow makers.
