= Étienne Pajeot =

French archetier and bowmaker (1791–1849)

Étienne Pajeot [Pageot] (25 January 1791 – 24 August 1849) was a French archetier and bowmaker.

== Biography ==
Son of Louis Simon (b. ? Grenoble, 1759; d. Mirecourt, 31 Jan 1804), who was also a bowmaker, Étienne produced superb bows.

"Pajeot remains one of the most brilliant craftsmen of his generation. He produced a large number of bows of remarkable quality, appreciated by musicians for their technical possibilities and by collectors for their aesthetic qualities." – Millant Raffin

"His bows are considered rare and exceptional" – Gennady Filimonov

"The surname appears in several spellings in documents relating to the family. When stamped on the bows it appears as PAJEOT. Some bows are not stamped but others are stamped twice, on the stick above the frog and also under the lapping. At least three other outstanding bowmakers supplied completed bows to Pajeot on which he stamped his name" – Nicolas Remy Maire, Nicolas Maline and Joseph Fonclause.

Each supplied bows in his own characteristic style, making possible their identification. In addition, lesser makers worked for Pajeot and are not identifiable. Pajeot made both round and octagonal bows; the former are more often seen. The pernambuco wood is often of superb quality, frequently of a veined, dark rich colour. The metal underslide of the frog usually ends in a turn to resist the wearing of the wood by the thumb. Some frogs are without underslide.

The pearl used in the frogs is of a green flamed abalone. The mountings vary and are of all possible combinations, most frequently in ebony and silver or a less expensive German silver, more rarely in gold and ivory or tortoise shell. Since a number of different makers worked for or supplied bows to Pajeot, the pattern of the heads vary. Those made by him have a distinctive charm and grace, being elegant with a flowing line created by a gently swept-back head. The bows are greatly appreciated and sought after by players. A full account of the lives and work of the Pajeot family is given in S. Bowden: Pajeot, Bow Makers of the 18th and 19th Centuries (London, 1991). - SIDNEY BOWDEN

"Not surprisingly, his style of work strongly influenced his contemporaries, and his ideas can be glimpsed in the later works of Nicolas Harmand, Dominique GrandAdam and his son Jean, Charles Guinot, Joseph Gaudé, Georges Ury, and Nicolas Mauchard, this last almost certainly a pupil or employee for many years." -

"Pajeot began as a successor to his father's style and rapidly evolved into something far more interesting. Early in his career he began to promote himself around the country, and he probably deserves the credit for being the first bowmaker to establish a large workshop employing many bowmakers. Since these ranks included such masters as Maire, Maline, and Fonclause, the workshop exerted an influence that ranged far beyond Mirecourt. He was extremely inventive where it came to innovations on the bow: his underslide with thumbseat protector, the buttons with welded collars, and innovations in the screw and eyelet and mortises were either uniquely his or were handled in his own personal manner." – Philip Kass

== Literature ==
- S. Bowden: Pajeot, Bow Makers of the 18th and 19th Centuries (London, 1991).
- Bowden, Sidney (2000). Gand - Pajeot. England: Morel, Gradoux-Matt. ISBN 0-9703198-0-0. (see René A. Morel)
- Raffin, Jean Francois; Millant, Bernard (2000). L'Archet. Paris: L'Archet Éditions. ISBN 2-9515569-0-X.
- Les Luthiers Parisiens aux XIX et XX siecles Tom 3 "Jean-Baptiste Vuillaume et sa famille" – Sylvette Milliot 2006
- Vatelot, Étienne (1976). Les Archet Francais. Sernor: M. Dufour. OCLC 2850939.
- Roda, Joseph (1959). Bows for Musical Instruments. Chicago: W. Lewis. OCLC 906667.

== Sources ==
- Bowden, Sidney (1991). Bow Makers of the 18th and 19th Centuries. London: Ealing Strings. ISBN 0-9504357-1-6.
- Bowden, Sidney (2000). Gand - Pajeot. England: Morel, Gradoux-Matt. ISBN 0-9703198-0-0. (see René A. Morel)
- Les Luthiers Parisiens aux XIX et XX siecles Tom 3 "Jean-Baptiste Vuillaume et sa famille" – Sylvette Milliot 2006
- Raffin, Jean Francois; Millant, Bernard (2000). L'Archet. Paris: L'Archet Éditions. ISBN 2-9515569-0-X.
- Roda, Joseph (1959). Bows for Musical Instruments. Chicago: W. Lewis. OCLC 906667.
- Vannes, Rene (1985) [First published 1951]. Dictionnaire Universel del Luthiers (vol.3). Bruxelles: Les Amis de la musique. OCLC 53749830.
- Vatelot, Étienne (1976). Les Archet Francais. Sernor: M. Dufour. OCLC 2850939.
- William, Henley (1969). Universal Dictionary of Violin & Bow Makers. Brighton, England: Amati. ISBN 0-901424-00-5.
