= Eury =

Eury is a surname. Notable people with the surname include:

- Jacob Eury (1765–1848), French luthier and bow maker
- Michael Eury (born 1957), American comic book editor and writer
- Tony Eury Jr. (born 1973), NASCAR crew chief

== See also ==
- Eudy
