= Jules Garcin =

French violinist, conductor and composer

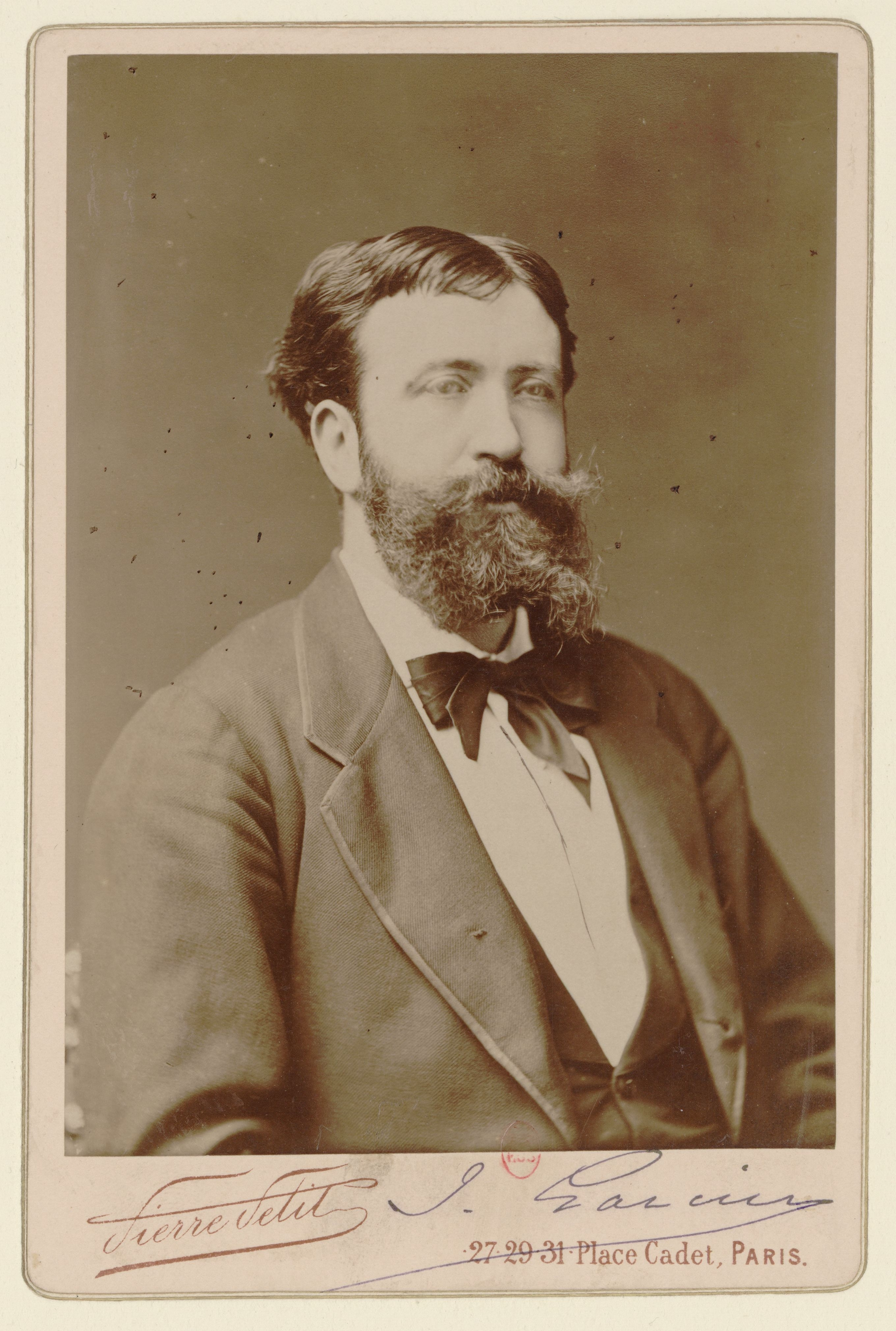
Jules Garcin in 1891 by Pierre Petit

Jules Auguste Garcin [Salomon] (11 July 1830 – 10 October 1896) was a French violinist, conductor and composer of the 19th century.

== Life ==
Garcin was born in Bourges. His maternal grandfather, Joseph Garcin, was director of a travelling company playing comic operas in the central and southern provinces of France.

Having entered the Paris Conservatoire in adolescence, studying under Clavel and Alard, Garcin took the Premier Prix for violin in 1853, and entered the Opéra orchestra in 1856. He became solo violinist, then third conductor in 1871, and finally chief conductor in 1885.

His long and successful teaching career at the Conservatoire de Paris began in 1875. Among his notable students were the child prodigy Henri Marteau (1874–1934) and Jules Boucherit (1877–1962).

Garcin's association with the Orchestre de la Société des Concerts du Conservatoire began in 1860, again as orchestral and then as solo violinist. In 1885, he was elected principal conductor of the Conservatoire concerts. In this post he actively promoted German choral and symphonic masterpieces, from Bach's Mass in B minor (in 1891) to works of Brahms and Wagner (Brahms's music was then the object of much adverse criticism in Paris during the Franco-Prussian War). He was a founder-member of the Société Nationale de Musique in 1871. He wrote some music (including a violin concerto and viola concertino), a certain amount of which was published by Lemoine.

Garcin also conducted the premiere of Franck's Symphony in D minor on 17 February 1889 at the Paris Conservatoire. This Symphony was dedicated to Henri Duparc, who was a member of "la bande à Franck" at the Conservatoire, along with Vincent D’Indy, Emmanuel Chabrier, and Paul Dukas. Three years later in 1892, Garcin retired and relinquished the post due to illness, but continued teaching. He died in Paris in 1896.

He performed on violins by Antonio Stradivari, the "Il Cremonese" of 1715 (now known as the Ex-Joachim), another Stradivari (Cremona, 1731) (now known as the ex-Garcin), as well as "Le Messie", a copy of 1868 by Jean-Baptiste Vuillaume.

== Accomplishments ==
Prizes achieved include: 2nd Prix, solfège, 1843; 1er Prix 1844; 2nd Prix, violin, 1851; 1er Prix 1853.

== Quotes ==
As a performer on the violin, he was a thorough artist, free from mannerisms which detract from real musicianship.

— Alberto Bachmann, 1925.

== Selected compositions ==
- Chanson de Mignon, Op. 11
- Concerto for violin and orchestra, Op. 14
- Concertino for viola (or cello) and orchestra, Op. 19 (1870)
- Villanelle for violin and piano, Op. 26
- Impromptu valse for violin and piano, Op. 29
- Canzonetta
- Fantasie concertante (Coppelia)
- Scherzo for violin and piano
- Suite symphonique

Preceded by Edouard Deldevez	Principal conductors, Orchestre de la Société des Concerts du Conservatoire which later became Orchestre de Paris; 1885–1892	Succeeded by Paul Taffanel
