= Vadim Repin =

Russian and Belgian violinist (born 1971)

- Вадим Репин
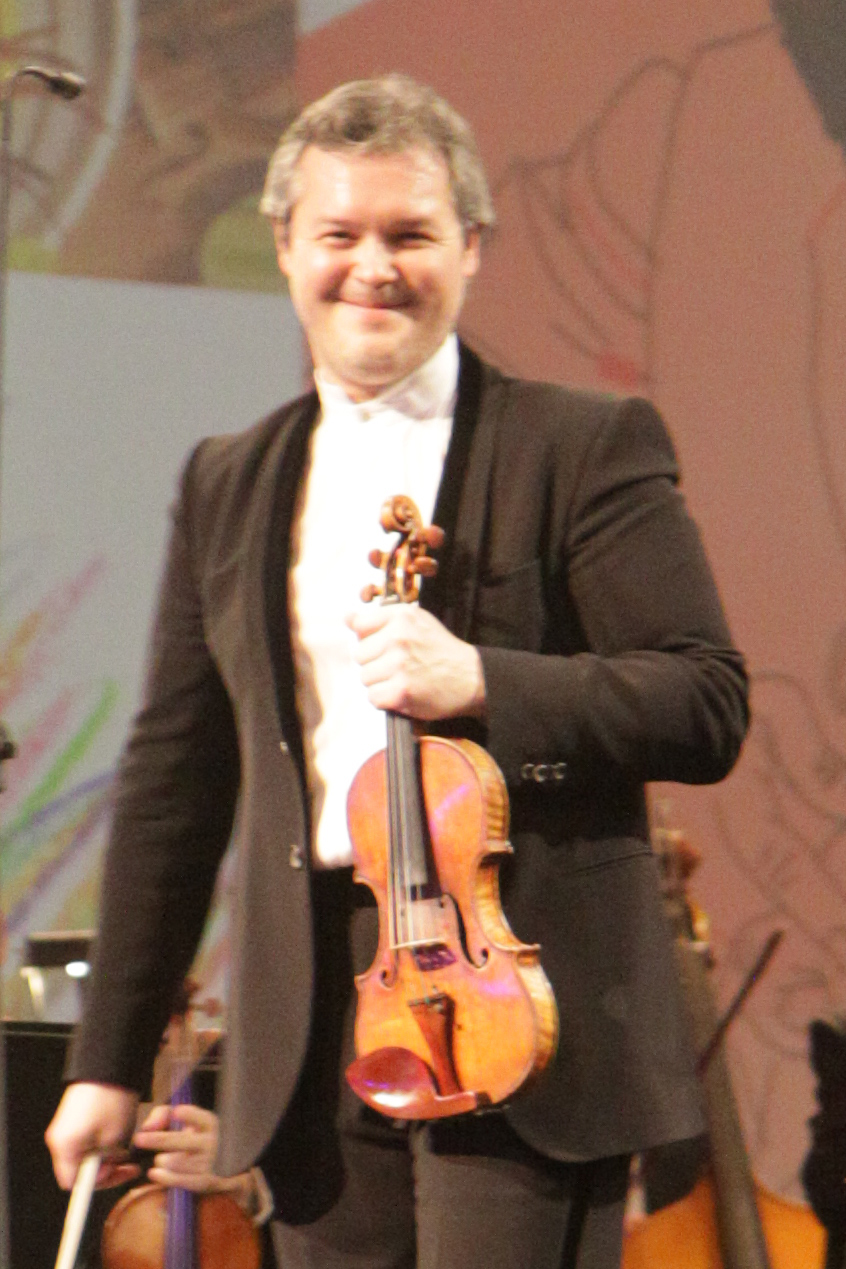
- Repin in 2011
- Born: Vadim Viktorovich Repin; 31 August 1971 (age 54); Novosibirsk, Russian SFSR, Soviet Union
- Education: Studied with Zakhar Bron
- Occupation: Classical violinist
- Years active: 1982–present
- Website: www.vadimrepin.com

Vadim Viktorovich Repin (Russian: Вадим Викторович Репин, [vɐˈdʲim ˈvʲiktərəvʲɪtɕ ˈrʲepʲɪn]; born 31 August 1971) is a Russian and Belgian violinist who lives in Vienna.

After hearing one of Repin's performances, violinist Yehudi Menuhin said: "Vadim Repin is simply the best and most perfect violinist that I have ever had the chance to hear."

== Education ==
Born in Novosibirsk in 1971, Vadim Repin began studying the violin with Zakhar Bron at the age of five, and after only six months made his first public appearance. In 1985, at the age of 14, he made his debut in Tokyo, Munich, Berlin, and Helsinki, and the following year he made his debut at Carnegie Hall.

== Professional career ==
At the age of 17, he became the youngest winner of violin section of the Queen Elisabeth Music Competition in Brussels. He was a member of the jury in the 2009 violin section of this competition. Vadim Repin has played under leading conductors including Yehudi Menuhin, Pierre Boulez, Riccardo Chailly, Charles Dutoit, Valery Gergiev, Mariss Jansons, James Levine, Zubin Mehta, Riccardo Muti, Simon Rattle, Esa-Pekka Salonen, Vladimir Ashkenazy, Kent Nagano, Seiji Ozawa, Christian Thielemann and Nayden Todorov.

Vadim Repin has been a frequent guest at festivals such as the BBC Proms, Tanglewood, Gstaad and Verbier. In 2010 he played the premiere of James MacMillan Violin Concerto with the London Symphony Orchestra under Gergiev which was dedicated to him.

== Repertoire and recordings ==
Repin specializes in Russian music and French music, particularly the great Russian violin concertos, as well as 20th-century and contemporary music.

== Instruments ==
- 1982-1984 a unique Stradivari three-quarter size on loan from the Russian State Collection
- 1984–1989 Stradivari 1720 "ex-Wieniawski-Wieniawski" on loan from the Russian State Collection
- 1996 Repin played shortly the Guarneri del Gesù 1737 "Isaac Stern ex-Panette-Panette," a loan by David Fulton
- 1996–2005 Stradivari 1708 "Ruby", as a loan by the Stradivari Society in Chicago and previously played by Pablo de Sarasate
- 2005 Guarneri del Gesù 1742 "Il Cannone ex Paganini" as a loan by the Municipal Administration of Genua for the use in a concert in the city
- 2002-2009 Guarneri del Gesù 1736 "Von Szerdahely"
- 2010-2013 Guarneri del Gesù 1743 "Bonjour"
- 2013-2015 Guarneri del Gesù 1736 "Lafont"
- Since 2015 Vadim Repin plays a Stradivari 1733 "Rode"

His preferred bows are by Nicolaus Kittel and Nicolas Maline.

== Personal life ==
Vadim Repin married Caroline Diemunsch in 2001. Their son Leonardo was born in 2006.

His current wife is Svetlana Zakharova, the principal dancer of the Bolshoi Ballet. They have a daughter, who was born in February 2011.
