= Joseph Arthur Vigneron =

French archetier / bowmaker (1851 - 1905)

Joseph Arthur Vigneron (b. Mirecourt, 1851; d. Paris, 1905) was an important French Archetier / Bowmaker.

He served his apprenticeship with his stepfather Charles Claude Husson in Mirecourt, where he studied side by side with Joseph Alfred Lamy père (father of the Lamy family of bow makers), who was less than a year older than he was. Vigneron worked with Husson until the latter's death in 1872, then he moved to the shop of Jean Joseph Martin. He worked for Gand & Bernardel Frères from 1880. By 1888 he opened his own workshop at 54 Rue de Cléry, Paris (not far away from his colleague Joseph Alfred Lamy père).

His bows were constructed using an individual style and selected wood. He maintained a rapid production pace, reportedly completing approximately six bows per week. His work reflected both his practical experience and attention to aesthetic design.

Vigneron had a fairly even camber along the stick. The curve was not like Voirin's, behind the head, but more in the middle of the bow, closer to the grip. Vigneron also designed bows with a sort of rounded triangular cross section which added stability to the bow (lower centre of gravity).

These bows were designed in collaboration with the violinist Lucien Capet (modele Lucien Capet was often stamped on such bows).

The sticks are characterized by their flexibility and strength, which contribute to the bow's distinct playability.

Vigneron's bow heads resemble the Voirin school, and some have a feminine interpretation of a late period Pierre Simon.

His bows are mostly silver mounted, with solid buttons and matching Parisian eyes. He was succeeded by his son André (1881 - 1924) a prolific maker in his father's style.

However, a large part of his output, while solidly made, lacks grace. Most of the bows are silver mounted; gold mountings are much less frequent and gold and tortoiseshell very rare. The sticks are usually round and the heads have pronounced chamfers at the throat. Vuillaume-type frogs are occasionally seen but otherwise the frogs are regular with either rounded or square heels. His bows are branded a. vigneron à paris.

On J.A. Vigneron’s death, his shop was taken over by his son André Vigneron (1881–1924).

== Quotes ==
"Few of the past French makers surpassed him in refinement."

"Many musicians are unconditional admirers of the production of this great master."

"Vigneron and Jules Fetique produced bows that at times could rival a Sartory in terms of strength and handling...." Stefan Hersh

"Vigneron's bows show elegant craftsmanship as well as superb quality pernambuco. His best bows can be ranked with the finest of his day." Gennady Filimonov
