= Pierre Simon =

French bowmaker

Pierre Simon (1 December 1808 – 12 December 1881), was a French archetier or musical bowmaker.

Simon became one of the most important bowmakers of his time. He worked in Paris for Peccatte, Vuillaume and Gand Frères. In 1847 he purchased Dominique Peccatte's business partnering with Joseph Henry until 1851. His bows have two distinct head models, one of his own and the other based on a Peccatte model. Not much is known about his early work. He probably apprenticed from the age of twelve in Mirecourt, working for someone like Pajeot (speculation based on the elegance of his work by P. Child).

He arrived in Paris in 1838. According to experts, Simon started making bows at least as early as 1827. The earliest bow attributed to him, however, according to Raffin & Millant, was made for Jean Baptiste Vuillaume, and dates only to 1845 when he was thirty-seven years old. Simon entered partnership with Joseph Henry from 1848 to 1851.

Simon was one of the most skilled bowmakers ever. He made bows on several patterns and of varying weights. Sometimes he used a model similar to the Peccatte interpretation of François Tourte, and these heavier Simon bows play similarly to Peccatte bows. On the other hand, the classic, bell-shaped Simon head is derived from an earlier Tourte model. These tend to be lighter and more flexible than the classic Peccatte model. The finest Simon bows have a highly attractive, lithe flexibility and a genuine beauty of tone.

Some of his bows bear the stamp: "Simon a Paris." His best bows are strong, finely balanced sticks which produce a smooth and velvety tone.

Simon is one of the few makers from 1850–1875 to have made octagonal bows either for himself or for Vuillaume. Pierre made few or no viola bows.

The chamfer of a Simon bow follows a large, generous curve which can be seen from the profile. Also, the chamfers are quite symmetrical in a Simon bow. Pierre made bows for Vuillaume, Gand Frères, Gand & Bernardel Frères, George Chanot and Bernardel et Fils. Pierre's brother, Barthélémy, younger by two years, was also a bow maker.

== General references ==
- Roda, Joseph (1959). Bows for Musical Instruments. Chicago: W. Lewis. OCLC 906667.
- Vatelot, Étienne (1976). Les Archet Francais. Sernor: M. Dufour. OCLC 2850939.
- Raffin, Jean Francois; Millant, Bernard (2000). L'Archet. Paris: L'Archet Éditions. ISBN 2-9515569-0-X.
- Les Luthiers Parisiens aux XIX et XX siecles Tom 3 "Jean-Baptiste Vuillaume et sa famille - Sylvette Milliot 2006
- Vannes, Rene (1985) [1951]. Dictionnaire Universel del Luthiers (vol.3). Bruxelles: Les Amis de la musique. OCLC 53749830.
- William, Henley (1969). Universal Dictionary of Violin & Bow Makers. Brighton; England: Amati. ISBN 0-901424-00-5.
- Violins & Bows - Jost Thoene 2006
