= Eugène Cuniot-Hury =

French archetier / bow maker (1861–1910)

- Born: 1861; France
- Died: 1910 (aged 48–49)

Eugène Cuniot-Hury (1861–1910) was a French archetier and bow maker based in Mirecourt, France.

Eugène Cuniot-Hury was son of Pierre Cuniot who was also an archetier / bow maker. Eugène Cuniot-Hury apprenticed with his father and became the teacher and employer of many outstanding French archetiers including: Émile François Ouchard (apprenticed with him 1886-1910 and succeeded his business), Pierre Maline and Louis Morizot. Alfred Lamy worked for Cuniot-Hury as well.
