= Charles Peccatte =

French archetier / bow maker (1850–1918)

Charles Peccatte (14 October 1850 – 22 October 1918) was a French Archetier (bow maker). He was born in Mirecourt, the son of François Peccatte and the nephew of Dominique Peccatte. He was trained by August Lenoble with whom he later had a partnership which lasted until 1881. The early work includes very individual bows which can be described as of the Peccatte school but many of which have heads modelled somewhat after the early type of bow by François Tourte.

In the majority of cases Charles Peccatte signed his bows with his name in full, which is also common practice in his uncle’s and father’s work. He differed, however, by signing his bows on both sides of the stick. To sign the sticks in this manner is quite unusual in the history of French bow making. There is a possibility that he may have been trying to differentiate himself from his predecessors by doing so.

Charles had a unique way of carving heads. This always gives an incredible impression of strength in comparison to their tiny volume. Yet, the heads of his bows are strong, powerful, yet still complementary to the light, elegant style of that era. His working of the bow sticks left them more rigid, which made them very powerful.

Charles worked for Vuillaume, Voirin and Lenoble, before opening own establishment at Paris, 1908. After the death of his Mother, Charles, freed from his ties with Lenoble, moved into his new home and workshop on the Rue de Valois. Here he moved into a more contemporary style of bow making also using different brand stamp. "His meritorious bows have received consistent acknowledgement from soloists." (Universal Dictionary of Violin and Bow Makers). The chamfer on a Charles Peccatte tends to go a little higher into the throat (or the stick itself) on the audience side of the bow.

The reason for the success of the bows of the Peccatte family is their individuality. All the Peccattes emanated a very strong, robust personality. Charles was no exception, keeping certain family traditions alive, such as the ‘wide’ head model.

The bows Charles made for J.-B. Vuillaume, closely resemble those made by François Nicolas Voirin for Jean-Baptiste Vuillaume. C. Peccatte won silver medals at the Antwerp and Paris Expositions Universelles in 1885 and 1889 respectively, and was established on his own at 8 rue de Valois, Paris, by 1885.

He is a teacher of Eugène Sartory.
