= Viktoria Mullova =

Russian violinist (born 1959)

- Born: 27 November 1959 (age 66); Zhukovsky, Moscow, Russian SFSR, Soviet Union
- Genre: Classical
- Occupation: Violinist
- Instruments: Violin, Baroque violin
- Website: viktoriamullova.com

Viktoria Yurievna Mullova (

Russian: Виктория Юрьевна Муллова, IPA: [vʲɪˈktorʲɪjə ˈmuləvə]; born 27 November 1959) is a Russian-born British violinist. She is best known for her performances and recordings of a number of violin concerti, compositions by J.S. Bach, and her innovative interpretations of popular and jazz compositions by Miles Davis, Duke Ellington, The Beatles, and others.

== Biography and early career ==
Mullova was born in Zhukovsky, 45 km from Moscow, in Soviet Russia. At the age of three, she was encouraged to start her violin training by her father Yuri Mullov, a Central Aerohydrodynamic Institute physicist and engineer. After studying at the Central Music School of Moscow and at the Moscow Conservatory under Leonid Kogan, she won first prize at the 1980 International Jean Sibelius Violin Competition in Helsinki and the gold medal at the International Tchaikovsky Competition in 1982. She remembered the whole experience of the Soviet quasi-religious state-sponsored musical education as an overly stressful nightmare full of hypocrisy: "Naturally, I have never believed in communism. But everything was a play. I knew I wanted to leave, and I was pretending to be a naive girl". (Note: Through verbal commentaries on music the Soviet ideology ‘appropriated’ the classical musical heritage. The last stages of the education system were developed by the composer and teacher Dmitry Kabalevsky. Classical music performers were household names rivaled to movie stars and popular singers through its constant presence on a Soviet TV, just like the ballet dancers and Kabalevsky's then-famous credo quote "Beauty Evokes Kindness" (Russian: Прекрасное пробуждает доброе, romanized: Prekrasnoe probuzhdaet dobroe) Vladimir Lenin's self-proclaimed atheism, as a lack of transcendental ideals that are important to the others, was perceived as wishful thinking because of Maxim Gorky's 1924 testimony about the leader's admiration for Issay Dobrowen's performance of the "preterhuman music" of one of Beethoven's 32 sonatas, all of them being the "New Testament" of Moscow Conservatory piano department (with The Well-Tempered Clavier as "Old Testament"; all-Soviet famous Hans von Bülow statement). The oppressive musical education system, as mentioned by Mullova, included thousands of state-sponsored regional non-special complementary children musical schools raising the professional classical music consumers mostly, after a full 8-year-course, and not only the professional musicians. The stable existence of multiple pre-professionally trained listeners has created additional pressure for the performers, sometimes have returned to classical music "from the front door" many years and even decades after the graduation from the musical school. As an example of attitude, Ludwig van Beethoven's classical song Marmotte has become a point of Soviet children's early, elementary school or kindergarten age introduction to the "unfading ethical ideal". The Soviet ideology was based on "another myth about Beethoven: a democrat, sansculotte, a man of the revolutionary era, a rebel, a revolutionary". Beethoven was ubiquitously wrongly referenced by kids with the false patronymic "Ludwig Ivanovich", from 'van', although his father's name was also a variation of "Ivan", and it has become a popular in-joke. After the dissolution of the Soviet Union, the system was financially "abandoned by the state to face the merciless fate" and, as a repentance for his collaboration with the Soviet authorities and a certain level of animosity, a lack of solidarity, towards his fellow composers Prokofiev and Shostakovich, Kabalevsky has been excluded from a shortlist of worthy Soviet-era composers. By 2019, the number of classical music fans was reduced to a fourth-place overall, 22 percent, behind the Russian/Soviet pop and "criminals' songs" (30 percent). It was still more than a number of people who attend religious services at least once a month, as of 2008. However, according to the Greek conductor Teodor Currentzis, the ongoing cultural genocide of instrumentalists and their admirers by the Russian officials is far from complete, yet close: "Russia has the best audience, the most educated".)

== Defection ==
During a tour of Finland in 1983, Mullova and her lover, Vakhtang Jordania, who posed as her accompanist so they could defect together, left the hotel in Kuusamo, after Jordania told the KGB officer who was watching them that Mullova was too sick from drinking to attend the afterparty. The Stradivari violin owned by the Soviet Union was left behind on the hotel bed. YLE journalist Jyrki Koulumies, accompanied by photographer Caj Sundman, drove them in a rented car across the border via Haparanda to Luleå, Sweden from where they flew to Stockholm.

At that time, the Swedish police treated the young, on-the-run musicians just like any other political defectors from the Eastern Bloc: they suggested that the couple stay in a safehouse over the weekend until the American Embassy opened so they could apply for political asylum upon relocation. So for two days they sat under pseudonyms in a safehouse not even daring to go outside, because their photographs were on the front page of every Swedish and international newspaper. Two days later they arrived in Washington, D.C., with American visas in their pockets.

== Life in the West ==
Mullova has made many recordings including her debut release of the Tchaikovsky and Jean Sibelius violin concertos which was awarded the Grand Prix du Disque.

She formed the Mullova Chamber Ensemble in the mid-1990s. The ensemble has toured Italy, Germany, and the Netherlands and has recorded the Bach violin concertos on Philips Classics. She was nominated for a 1995 Grammy Award for her recording of the Bach Partitas, and she won a 1995 Echo Klassik award, a Japanese Record Academy Award and a Deutsche Schallplattenkritik prize for her recording of the Brahms violin concerto. Her recording of the Brahms B major Trio (no. 1) and Beethoven's Archduke Trio with André Previn and Heinrich Schiff was released in 1995, receiving a further Diapason d'Or.

Mullova's international career as a soloist has included performances with the Royal Concertgebouw Orchestra, the Philharmonia, the Berlin Philharmonic, the Vienna Symphony, the Montreal Symphony Orchestra, the Sofia Philharmonic, the San Francisco Symphony and the Bavarian Radio Symphony Orchestra. She has also performed as soloist and director with the Orchestra of the Age of Enlightenment.

Mullova plays the Jules Falk Stradivarius from 1723 and a violin made in 1750 by Giovanni Battista Guadagnini. Her bows include a Baroque style bow by a Walter Barbiero, one of the finest makers of modern bows, a Dodd and a Voirin.

== Personal life ==
Mullova currently lives in Holland Park, London, England, with her husband, cellist Matthew Barley, and three children: the jazz bassist Misha Mullov-Abbado, from her relationship with conductor and pianist Claudio Abbado; Katia, from her relationship with violinist Alan Brind; and Nadia, who is a dancer in the Royal Ballet, from her marriage to Barley.

== Selected discography ==
- Beethoven Violin Sonatas Nos. 3, 9 (Onyx 4050). With Kristian Bezuidenhout; 2010
- JS Bach Sonatas & Partitas for violin solo (Onyx 4040); 2009
- JS Bach Sonatas for violin and harpsichord (Onyx 4020). With Ottavio Dantone; 2007
- Vivaldi 5 violin concertos (Onyx 4001). With Il Giardino Armonico; 2005
- Beethoven and Mendelssohn Violin Concertos (Philips, 473 872–2). With Orchestre Révolutionnaire et Romantique/John Eliot Gardiner; 2003
- Mozart: Violin Concertos Nos. 1, 3-4 (Philips, 470 292). With Orchestra of the Age of Enlightenment; 2002
- Through the Looking Glass (Philips, 464 184–2). With Matthew Barley and Between the Notes; 2000
- Bartók and Stravinsky Violin Concertos (Philips, 456 542–2). With Los Angeles Philharmonic Orchestra/Esa-Pekka Salonen; 1997
- Brahms Violin Sonatas (Philips, 446 709–2). With pianist Piotr Anderszewski; 1997
- Tchaikovsky and Sibelius Violin Concertos(Philips 416 821–2) Boston Symphony Orchestra/Seiji Ozawa; 1985

== See also ==
- List of Eastern Bloc defectors
