= Eugène Sartory =

French bow maker / archetier (1871–1946)

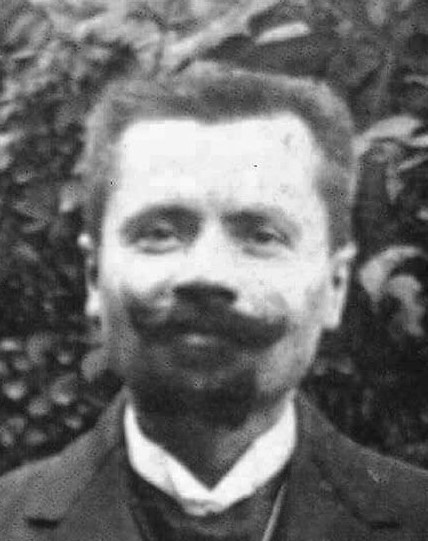
- Eugène Sartory c. 1912
- Born: 22 September 1871; Mirecourt, France
- Died: 5 March 1946 (aged 74); Paris, France
- Education: Charles Peccatte; Joseph Alfred Lamy
- Known for: Bow maker

Eugène Nicolas Sartory (22 September 1871, Mirecourt – 5 March 1946, Paris) was an influential French archetier/bow maker from Mirecourt, France. After having first apprenticed with his father, he went on to work in Paris for Charles Peccatte and Joseph Alfred Lamy before setting up his own shop in 1889.

His bows are marked "E.SARTORY A PARIS". The apex of the trend toward heavy, strong bows was exemplified in the output of Eugène Sartory, who developed a style of bow to which his atelier adhered consistently for decades. He fortified the Voirin model, producing sturdily built bows with strong shafts. Later on Sartory innovated the design of his bows; widening the head and altering the shaft cross-section as well as thickening the shaft above the handle. These changes provided more stability and reliability in the handling. In his early period, Sartory preferred dark pernambuco wood, whereas the later bows are generally of lighter color.

Vigneron and Fétique produced bows that at times could rival a Sartory in terms of strength and handling, but the consistency of Sartory bows has made them a favorite among musicians even if they lack some of the subtlety of older bows. Sartory bows are reliable as playing tools and will satisfy a variety of players. His list of assistants includes Louis Morizot (perè), Jules Fétique & Louis Gillet. Hermann Wilhelm Prell worked for Sartory in Paris between 1897 and 1898.

== Honors and awards ==
- 1894 Lyon (France) International and Colonial Exhibition
- 1897 Bruxelles (date corrected thanks to Isaac Salchow)
- 1900 Paris (France) Universal and International Exhibition.
- 1905 Liege (Belgium) Universal and International Exhibition.
- 1906 Milan (Italy) Exposizione Internationale del Sempione
- 1908 London (Great-Britain) Franco-British Exhibition

== Quotes ==
"The name Sartory is universally recognized due to the prolific and consistent output from the Sartory atelier. All of these qualities to make Sartory’s among the least difficult bows to sell. Consequently the margin between wholesale and retail pricing is narrower with Sartory bows than with other fine string instruments and bows." - Stefan Hersh

"Sartory bows are synonymous with reliability and consistency and are the bow of choice for many professional musicians." - Gennady Filimonov
