= Bergonzi =

Bergonzi is an Italian surname. It is the surname of the following:

- Bernard Bergonzi (born 1929), British literary scholar, critic and poet
- Carlo Bergonzi (tenor) (1924–2014), Italian singer
- Carlo Bergonzi (luthier) (1683–1747), Italian violin maker
- Caroline Bergonzi (born 1972), Monegasque sculptor/artist
- Charles Bergonzi (1910–1986), Monegasque sports shooter
- Jerry Bergonzi (born 1947), American jazz saxophonist
- Riccardo Bergonzi (born 1961), Italian luthier
