= Jean Adam (bow maker) =

French bow maker (1823 - 1869)

Jean Adam (1823–1869) was a (third generation) Master French bow maker known as "Grand Adam" (not to be confused with his grandfather also named Jean Adam). His bows are highly sought after.

Jean was born in Mirecourt on 26 February 1823. Grand Adam served his apprenticeship and continued to work under his father, Jean Dominique Adam (1795–1864) until 1842 when he went to Paris to work for Jean Baptiste Vuillaume. For the most part, "he was inspired by his father and also perhaps by Joseph Fonclause." Paris played an integral part in his development as a master craftsman. At the height of his promising career, he decided to return to Mirecourt in 1853 where he set up his own shop and produced a great number of bows. His bows show a very individual style. He lived a short life, dying at age 46 on 20 January 1869

"François Tourte possessed not only the ingenuity to bring the bow to perfection, but also the skill to make bows of unsurpassed quality which are still sought after by players and emulated by makers."

"Both Jean Dominique and his son "Grand" Adam seemed to favor François Tourte's design (octagonal sticks) and thus produced a great many octagonal bows." - Gennady Filimonov

".....one of the top mid-19th century French Master Bow Makers whose bows are highly sought after." -
