= Joseph Alfred Lamy =

French archetier / bow maker (1850 - 1919)

Joseph Alfred Lamy (père) (8 September 1850 – 1919), was an important French archetier (bow maker) of the early twentieth century known as Lamy Père.

He was born in Mirecourt, Vosges, France, where he apprenticed from 1862 to 1868, and later worked from 1877 to 1885 for François Nicolas Voirin in Paris. He started his apprenticeship in 1862 with Charles Claude Nicolas Husson. In 1868, he joined Gautrot's workshop in Château Thierry, where he met François Nicolas Voirin. In 1876, he came to Paris to work with François Nicolas Voirin, whose assistant he had become. In 1885, at the death of François Nicolas Voirin, he started his own workshop at 34 rue du Faubourg Poissonière. His firstborn son Hippolyte Camille Lamy and nephew Alfred Lamy carried on the family tradition. He branded his bows "A. LAMY A PARIS".

== Biography ==
Lamy emerged from a great period in French bowmaking and faithfully carried on the tradition. In 1889 he received the silver and gold medals at the Paris Exposition. His son Hippolyte Camille Lamy-fils, (1876–1944) carried on in his father's tradition succeeding him at his death in 1919. Like François Nicolas Voirin, Lamy-père was influenced by Jean Baptiste Vuillaume, whose model he frequently used between 1886 and 1890. By 1880 many makers were beginning to consistently aim for an even heavier, stronger model, with varying degrees of success. Lamy's mature period began as early as 1889 to 1890, when he was still only forty. His model, characterized by a slight increase in volume for the sticks as well as for the frogs, became clearer and was adopted definitively. Lamy picked up where François Nicolas Voirin left off, with similar variance in weight and quality of materials. His pupils include Eugene Sartory, whose work he had influenced as well as that of his son, Lamy-fils. "Today Lamy (père) is regarded as one of the foremost makers of his generation." — Filimonov Fine Violins

== Awards and medals ==
He won the silver and gold Medals at the Paris Exposition in 1889.
