= Amédée-Dominique Dieudonné =

French luthier (1890 - 1960)

Amédée Dominique Dieudonné (6 August 1890 – 1 February 1960) was a French luthier. His instruments sold in Europe and the United States.

== Biography ==
The son of the luthier Albert Dieudonné, Amédée Dominique Dieudonné was born on 6 August 1890 in Mirecourt in the Vosges department. Amédée Dominique Dieudonné was formed by Gustave Bazin and then at the Darche workshop in Brussels. After the First World War, he established himself as a luthier in Mirecourt in the 1920s. Specializing in the copies of the Cremona masters, he excelled in the rendering of varnishes, going from red to bright red.

Amédée Dominique Dieudonné died on 1 February 1960, in Mirecourt.

Among his numerous pupils were Charles René Bazin, Jacques then Alfred-Eugène Holder, Pierre Vogelweith, Rembert Würlizer, Victor Aubry, Philippe Coornaert, William Mönig, Jean Striebig, Étienne Vatelot.

== Sources ==
- René Vannes : Essai d’un dictionnaire universel des luthiers, Librairie Fischbacher, Paris, 1932, 430 pages
