= Bazin family =

French family of archetiers / bow makers

Atelier de Bazin

The Bazin family is a highly esteemed family of bowmakers operating in Mirecourt, France from around 1840 throughout most of the 1900s.

The bowmaking dynasty began with François Bazin and ended with Charles Alfred Bazin (1907 - 1987). The onset of the Industrial Revolution came the idea of a giant enterprise that dominated the industry until the 1960s, such as Jerome Thibouville-Lamy and Laberte-Magnie in the musical instruments trade.

François Xavier Bazin (b. Mirecourt 1824 - d. Mirecourt 1865) - was a French archetier / master bowmaker and was first of the Bazin dynasty. Notable experts suggest that he was influenced and purportedly studied with Dominique Peccatte in Paris, and possibly Jean-Baptiste Vuillaume, also in Paris, before establishing himself in Mirecourt around 1840. He died at the age of 41, apparently of cholera. He was the brother of Charles-Nicolas Bazin I.

Charles-Nicolas Bazin I, (1831 - 1908), brother of François Xavier Bazin. Among his apprentices was Célestin Émile Clasquin.

Charles Nicolas Bazin II, (1847 - 1915), son of François Xavier Bazin, learned bowmaking from his father. Upon his father's death, he found himself at the head of the family business-indeed a hefty responsibility for a boy of 18. Two years later, he married his first cousin, Jeanne-Emélie Bazin, with whom he had three sons: Emile-Joseph, Gustave and Charles Louis.

He was a great craftsman and was responsible for producing a great many bows that are still in demand. In his Mirecourt workshop, he employed some of the most famous bow makers. In the first six years of the 1900s there were between 12 and 17 makers producing some 2 000 - 3 000 quality bows a year. The makers included: Fetique Brothers, Claude Husson, Granier, Lorange, Tournier, Delprato, Ouchard, Jacquemin, Dumont, Couturieux, Richaume, Bourgeois, Bontemps. He died on 6 December 1915. Charles Nicolas spent fifty-six years of his life devoted to making bows.

Charles Louis Bazin (Louis Bazin) fils (1881 - 1953) son, pupil and successor (in 1907) of Charles-Nicolas Bazin II. He started making bows from the age of 12, served his apprenticeship with his father. He took over the family workshop in 1907 where his father continued to work with him until his death in 1915. In 1922, Charles Alfred BAZIN, one of Charles Louis BAZIN’s two sons, started his apprenticeship and worked alongside his father until 1945. Charles Louis BAZIN retired in 1952, his son Charles Alfred BAZIN took over his workshop. Louis Bazin is considered the most important of the Bazin family, and has achieved the highest standard and renown in his craft. During the 20th century Louis Bazin’s bows were widely acclaimed by French virtuosi. ”No better bows made by any contemporary maker.” - William Henley

Eustache-Joseph Bazin (1823 1864) son of Francois, also became a bowmaker.

Emile Joseph Bazin (1868 - 1956) son of Charles Nicolas. Did his apprenticeship with his father, leaving at age 17 to spend 1885-89 working at Hill & Sons in London, most likely alongside Samuel Allen, among others. Emile left the bow making profession and, by the time he married (Marie-Nathalie Husson) in 1893, had become a music professor.

Gustave BAZIN (1871 - 1920) second son of Charles-Nicolas Bazin II, was the first violin maker in the family. His students included Amèdée Dieudonne, Marcel Vatelot and Charles Enel.

René BAZIN (1906 - 1982) son and pupil of Charles-Louis (for bow making), pupil of Dieudonné (for instrument making). He was more attracted by violin making. Worked with Marcel Vatelot in Paris, and with Fridolin Hamma in Stuttgart. Died on 30 December 1982 in Munich. Possessed an important library of violin makers and their works which was dispersed upon his death. He was himself, the author of research concerning Jean Baptiste Vuillaume.

Charles Alfred BAZIN (1907 - 1987) second son of Charles-Louis (Louis Bazin), with whom he worked (1922). Established on his own accord in 1945, at Mirecourt, succeeded his father in 1952. Retired in 1980, he was the last bow maker of the great family.

Apprentices and workmen who worked for Charles Alfred Bazin included: Francois Lotte, Rene Lotte (cousin of Francois Lotte), Louis Morizot, Louis Gillet, Marcel Lapierre, Jean-Claude Ouchard (son of Emile A. Ouchard) and many others.
