= Marcel Lapierre =

French bow maker / archetier (1907–1979)

Marcel Charles Lapierre (1907–1979) was a French bow maker/archetier who has been described as a "maker of very fine bows much sought after by soloists."

Born 1907 in Mirecourt, served his apprenticeship in Jérôme Thibouville Lamy from 1921 to 1923. After his apprenticeship he joined Brouiller & Lotte's workshop. From 1931 to 1936 he worked with Francois Lotte, before joining Louis Bazin and Louis Morizot. In 1946 he came to Genève and joined the Pierre Vidousez's workshop. In 1948 he returned to Mirecourt to start his own workshop first at rue Vuillaume and then rue Gambetta.
