= Louis Morizot =

French archetier / bow maker (1874 - 1957)

Louis Morizot (1874–1957) was an influential French bow maker of great reputation.

== Biography ==
Louis was born in Darney (Vosges), and worked in Mirecourt, France where he started a family dynasty. Louis Morizot began his apprenticeship with Eugène Cuniot-Hury, before joining the workshop of Charles Nicolas Bazin.

Circa 1914 he worked for Eugène Sartory an experience which influenced greatly his personal production. In 1919 Louis Morizot established his own workshop at 5 rue Saint Georges in Mirecourt. After 1920, his sons ( Marcel, Louis, Paul, André, and George Morizot) joined him as pupils before succeeding him in 1937 and renaming the firm "MORIZOT Frères".

== Morizot Dynasty ==
"Louis Morizot trained many pupils including Bernard Millant and his five sons Marcel, Louis, Paul, André, and George Morizot.." Among the six sons son's of Louis Père, the well-known Mirecourt bow maker, René (the youngest), is the only one to have dedicated his life to violin making." René Morizot served his apprenticeship in Mirecourt with Emile Audinot. He settled in Mirecourt at 8 rue Saint Georges, in 1933. In 1969, he joined the National school of violin making as a Master teacher, in Mirecourt, where he stayed until 1982. His great grandson, Didier Claudel, entered the Mirecourt school in 1974 and became a master bow maker, he is still working at the craft today, based in South West France.

== Honors and awards ==
Louis Père won the Grand Prix at the first exhibition Artisanale de Paris in 1924. (Meilleur Ouvrier de France). Gold medal at the Exposition Artisanale de Paris in 1927.

== Quotes ==
"Morizot brothers (Marcel, Louis, Paul, André, and George Morizot) trained with their father Louis Morizot. They in turn have trained many pupils including Jean-Jacques Millant, Bernard Millant, Roger François Lotte, Marcel Lapierre and Charles Alfred Bazin
