= Jules Falk Stradivarius =

1723 antique violin made by Antonio Stradivari

The Jules Falk Stradivarius is an antique violin made in 1723 by Italian luthier Antonio Stradivari of Cremona (1644-1737). The instrument is currently owned and played by Russian violinist Viktoria Mullova. She acquired it from Sotheby's in 1985, two years after her defection from the Soviet Union.

== See also ==
- Stradivarius
