= Jean Pierre Marie Persois =

French bow maker

Jean Pierre Marie Persoit [Persois] - (21 June 1785 in Mirecourt – 29 December 1866) was a notable French bowmaker or Archetier.

One of the first bowmakers to be hired by the young Jean Baptiste Vuillaume. Persoit seems to have worked in this studio for at least 15 years (1823–41 according to Millant; 1828–43 according to Étienne Vatelot).

It nevertheless remains difficult to recognize his work under the Vuillaume stamp.

His best bows, are remarkably close to the François Tourte style (especially those with octagonal sticks), though there are small but telling differences: the octagonals are not so sharply planed; the heads are rather more squared; the frogs are more solid and with shallower throats; and the distinctive buttons have unequally wide bands which cover most of the ebony.

Persoit's round-shafted bows are more personal and generally bulkier than the Tourte ideal. Most are also slightly short. His brand PRS is stamped on the stick under the frog and under the lapping, occasionally as many as three times, although sometimes not at all. His work is only rarely seen today but much appreciated. It is most likely that Persoit left Paris after 1854 either to retire or to be cared for. "Some may not be aware that it was Persoit (Persois) who trained Dominique Peccatte".

An absolute Master who stands on that crest of the bowmaking elite hitherto reserved for François Tourte and Dominique Peccatte.

— Paul Childs, Montrose, NY 1993.

== Bibliography ==
- Childs, Paul (1993). Jean Pierre Marie Persoit: his Life and Work. Montrose, NY: Magic Bow. ISBN 0-9651788-3-8.
- https://tarisio.com/cozio-archive/cozio-carteggio/found-the-birth-and-death-dates-of-persoit/
