= Nikolaus Kittel =

Russian bow maker (1806–1868)

Nikolai Ferdinandovich Kittel (1806 – 18 April 1868) was a Russian violin and bow maker who is often still mistakenly considered as of German origin, and was known as the "Russian Tourte". According to the latest findings, his full name was Nikolai Ferdinandovich Kittel and that he was of Austrian origin as stated in his marriage certificate. Kittel always signed letters and invoices with the name Nikolai Kittel. In all German and French documents, he was named Nikolai, and not Nikolaus.

== Background ==
Kittel was an enigmatic figure (who worked in St. Petersburg 1825-1868). He is known to have employed some of the leading makers, (as did his great Parisian contemporary Jean-Baptiste Vuillaume), including Russian, Vladimir Ivanoff, German Heinrich Knopf, and his son Nikolai Nikolaevich Kittel to make his bows.

In Czarist Russia, Kittel served as violinmaker to the Imperial Court of Russia, making superb violins which were considered the best made in Russia, and produced bows of unsurpassed quality, often using beautiful highly flamed wood.

The design of Kittel bows is also derived from an advanced François Tourte model although this interpretation of Tourte is distinctly different from the French interpretations.

Kittel died on April 18, 1868, at the age of 63. His obituary stated: 'Thus, in the realm of the bow, the curtain was drawn on a career of memorable achievement'.

"Henri Vieuxtemps preferred Kittel bows even to those of F.X. Tourte. Since then, Kittel's bows have been used by the greatest soloists, among them Henryk Wieniawski, Jascha Heifetz, Mischa Elman, Toscha Seidel, Leopold Auer, Isaac Stern, Paul Kochanski, Aaron Rosand, Erica Morini, Efrem Zimbalist, Leonid Kogan, Yehudi Menuhin, Natalia Gutman, Gidon Kremer and Vadim Repin. Kittel bows are extremely rare. In 1999, a gold and tortoiseshell-mounted violin bow made in St Petersburg in the mid 19th century by Kittel and from the Yehudi Menuhin Collection, fetched £51,000 (Sotheby's auction, London : £58,650 / US$94,837 with buyers premium) more than three times the high pre-sale estimate (est: £10,000-15,000)." - Filimonov Fine Violins - 2007

== Quotes ==
- "Until the collapse of Soviet Union (1989-1990), the exact birth date and the date of his death was ambiguous due to lack of factual information from behind the "Iron Curtain", especially due to the many events such as the Bolshevik Revolution, the Russian Civil War, World War I, World War II and of course the Cold War (mid-1940s until the early 1990s). Many of the well known violin/bow books starting with the Lutgendorff (published in 1922) and some who have since copied his "information" (such as the Henley, Roda, Vannes and others), relied on speculation stating his dates as (1839–1870) . To reiterate, the correct date for this maker is: Nikolai Ferdinandovich Kittel b. 1806 – d. April 18, 1868 ". Gennady Filimonov (2007)
- "Nikolai Kittel died on April 18, 1868 at the age of 63. His obituary stated: 'Thus, in the realm of the bow, the curtain was drawn on a career of memorable achievement'.
- "Heifetz: I prefer my Kittel that Professor Auer gave me as a gift a long time ago. But I don't always use it. I have others. The Kittel must rest. It gets tired. . . sometimes it needs hair." - Jascha Heifetz
- Nikolai Ferdinandovich Kittel was born 1805 or 1806 in St. Petersburg, Roman Catholic, Austrian nationality, counted back from his marriage certificate from 27 July 1841, when he marries at the age of 35. E. Vitachek designates the year of birth 1806, however, without documentation.

== World record price ==
- More recently, the auction record for this maker: London, March, 2015 – A Fine and Rare Cello Bow by Nikolai Kittel, Gold and Tortoiseshell mounted stick c. 1850 Tarisio Auctions, London: GBP 143,000 (US$211,543.24) Filimonov Fine Violins - 2015

== Bibliography ==
- Moscow, Russian Federation archives
- Strad magazine - "Nikolaus Ferder Kittel: The Russian Tourte" by Harvey and Georgeanna Whistler
- Strad - 'Favorite Bow' - article by Joseph Gold (recollection of Jasha Heifetz and his Kittel bow)
- VSA 14 #2 1995 Nicolaus Kittel: The Russian Tourte by Kenway Lee 183
- Jascha Heifetz: An Interview with Herbert Axelrod", VSA Proceedings, Vol. IV, No. 1, Winter, 1977/78, 1977.
- Roda, Joseph (1959). Bows for Musical Instruments. Chicago: W. Lewis. ISBN 2-85955-002-X. OCLC 906667.
- Vannes, Rene (1985) [1951]. Dictionnaire Universel del Luthiers (vol.3). Bruxelles: Les Amis de la musique. OCLC 53749830.
- William, Henley (1969). Universal Dictionary of Violin & Bow Makers. Brighton; England: Amati. ISBN 0-901424-00-5.
- Die Geigen und Lautenmacher - by Lutgendorff, Frankfurt 1922.
- Encyclopedia of the Violin - Alberto Bachmann
- Deutsche Bogenmacher-German Bow Makers Klaus Grunke, Hans-Karl Schmidt, Wolfgang Zunterer 2000
- Vitachek, E. Ocherki po istorii izgotovleniia smychkovykh instrumentov, 2nd ed. Edited by B. V. Dobrokhotov. Moscow, 1964
- The Bows of Nikolai Kittel- Klaus Grünke, Josef P. Gabriel, Yung Chin, Andy Lim in co-operation with Darling Publications Andy Lim Cologne, 2011
- Nikolai Kittel-Violoncello, St. Petersburg, 1833, ed. by Andy Lim, Darling Publications Andy Lim Cologne, 2011
