= Riccardo Bergonzi =

- Born: Cremona
- Occupation: Violinmaker
- Instrument: Violin

Riccardo Bergonzi (born 1961 in Cremona, Italy, Bergonzi) began his work as a violin maker at the early age of 12 when he made his first instrument at Sefano Conia’s workshop. Bergonzi graduated at the top of his class and also received the Gold Medal “G. Merola” from the violin making school in Cremona in 1979. Shortly after his graduation, he began teaching at his alma mater. During his 10 years as a teacher, he received several awards for his instruments and was also awarded a gold medal as the “youngest violin maker” at the Bagnacavallo exhibition. Bergonzi’s attention to the set up and sound of his instruments has made him a highly successful violin maker, known throughout the world. Not only is he accomplished in this field, he has also enjoyed painting, sculpting, and wood and bronze working. His hobbies have complemented his work as a violin maker, causing him to be even more attentive to artistic details on his instruments. Recently, Bergonzi has taken the time to find joy in his hobbies after many years of violin making. *
