= Die Geigen und Lautenmacher vom Mittelalter bis zur Gegenwart =

Die Geigen- und Lautenmacher vom Mittelalter bis zur Gegenwart (The Violin and Lute Makers From the Middle Ages to the Present) is one of the earliest comprehensive reference books for violins and luthiers. It was compiled by Willibald Leo von Lütgendorff (1856–1937) and originally published in 1904.

== Editions ==
- 1st ed. (1 Vol.), Frankfurt am Main: Verlag von Heinrich Keller (1904)

(online copy via Internet Archive)
OCLC 610409226

- Nachtrag (supplement), Altenburg: Pierersche Hofbuchdruckerei Stephan Geibel & Co. (1905?)

(online copy via HathiTrust)
OCLC 855977518, 16644738, 16644745

- 4th ed. (2 Vols.) Frankfurt am Main: Verlag von Heinrich Keller (1913)

OCLC 457744690, 16500871, 55403698
OCLC 716761587

- 6th ed. Frankfurt am Main: Frankfurter Verlag-Anstalt A.G. (de) (publisher) (1922)

Vol. 1 (online copy via Google Books)
Vol. 2 (online copy via Internet Archive)
OCLC 2110375

5th and 6th ed. (reprint), Nendeln, Liechtenstein: Kraus Reprint Ltd. (1968)

OCLC 22010362, 220457771

6th ed. (reprint), Tutzing: Hans Schneider (de) (publisher) (1975)

OCLC 58627567, 930419888, 930419892
OCLC 911770196

- Ergänzungsband (supplement, as Vol. 3), by Thomas Drescher, Tutzing: Hans Schneider (de) (1990)

OCLC 21867907, 238486897, 930419887
OCLC 923548815, 721929319, 843599709
OCLC 611895760, 3795206162, 311096880
OCLC 631829697, 631251053
