= Eudy =

Eudy is both a given name and a surname. Notable people with the name include:

- Eudy Simelane (1977–2008), South African footballer and activist
- Sid Eudy (1960–2024), American professional wrestler
