= André Vigneron =

French archetier / bowmaker (1881 - 1924)

André Vigneron (born 1881 in Paris (Ile de France) – died 1924 in Paris (Ile de France)) was a French Archetier / Bowmaker.

André Vigneron learnt his craft with his father, Joseph Arthur Vigneron. He also worked in the workshop of Eugene Sartory. André succeeded his father in 1905. He used a personal model for the heads of his bows which is characteristic. His work is of excellent quality.
