= Jean Joseph Martin =

French archetier / bowmaker (1837 - 1910)

Jean Joseph Martin (b. Mirecourt (Vosges) 1837 – d. Paris 1910) was a French Archetier / Bowmaker.

Served his apprenticeship with Nicolas Remy Maire. In 1858 left Mirecourt for Paris to join Jean-Baptiste Vuillaume's workshop. Five years later, JJ MARTIN came back to Mirecourt (1863) to open his own workshop. He also worked with Jérôme THIBOUVILLE LAMY as they asked for his collaboration to build up their bow production.

For a brief time, Martin also worked as director for another workshop in Mirecourt by Emile MENNESSON, with the "Sainte Cécile" insignia. From that period one can find bows stamped J. Guarini. When MENNESSON decided to transfer his activity to Reims, J.J. Martin took over the workshop and continued the production for a while.

Among his collaborators (in his shop) was Joseph Arthur Vigneron.

== Quotes ==
"...about J.J. Martin. He worked for Vuillaume, in a style broadly reminiscent to that of the young François Nicolas Voirin, and then in 1863 returned to Mirecourt to establish a business, run more or less as a collective, which unfortunately failed in 1880. His idea might have been to create a shop like that of Maire, but Maire had long since moved to the Capital since that was where his success was most likely. The businesses that did succeed in Mirecourt were the big industrial enterprises, the first and most famous being that of Jerome Thibouville-Lamy, which was followed a few years later by that of Laberte-Magnie.

Thibouville-Lamy arrived in town from Paris in 1861, married the daughter of a well-to-do businessman (and appended her name to his), and set up a giant enterprise that dominated the industry until the 1960s. This was true industrialization and mass-production, and if the quality was consistently excellent, the results were also consistently anonymous, and the average craftsman in Mirecourt ended up there as a life-long piece goods worker. Ironically, Martin had assisted in setting up the Thibouville-Lamy bowmaking workshop before devoting his efforts to his own doomed enterprise." - Philip Kass

"His best work (made during his tenure at Vuillaume shop) resembles that of F.N. Voirin, especially the bows with Vuillaume style frog(s)" - Gennady Filimonov

"We may regret that an honest and hardworking man, no doubt like other lesser known craftsmen, could have found it so difficult to make a living at that time. J.J. Martin was unfortunately more gifted as a maker than as a businessman." Millant-Raffin
