= Heinrich Knopf =

German bowmaker

Heinrich Carl Knopf (1839–1875) was an award winning German bowmaker or bogenmacher.

== Biography ==
Knopf came from a dynasty of bow makers. He studied bow making in Markneukirchen under his uncle, Christian Friedrich Wilhelm Knopf. He was a journeyman in Leipzig working for Ludwig Bausch. Upon the death of his father, Karl Wilhelm, he returned to Markneukirchen where he became his successor. In 1867, Heinrich Knopf was awarded a bronze medal for violin and cello bows at the Chemnitz Trade Exhibition. In 1868, he moved to Dresden, living at 9 Brudergasse, the same block as Richard Weichold. One year later, he and his family moved to Berlin. In 1873, Heinrich was awarded a "recognition diploma" at the Vienna World Exhibition for a 'very good violin with strong and beautiful tone' and 'for excellent bows made for string instruments'. He also supplied bows to German shops such as Bausch, R. Weichold and the Russian Nicolaus Kittel.

"The bows (he) made for Kittel are quite different in style from the ones he supplied to the German shops." — Kenway Lee

"His bows are exquisite, showing mastery in technical as well as stylistic aspects. His son, Heinrich Richard gen. Knopf (1860–1939) (known as Henry) became an excellent bow & violin maker who established what was to become a very important and successful shop in New York City (from 1879–1931)."

Auction World Record: Tarisio Berlin October 2021 Lot 80 Violin Bow Nikolai KITTEL made by Heinrich Knopf (c.1865-70) €94,400 = US$109,500
