= Vigneron (bow makers) =

Vigneron was a family of French bow makers. Notable members include Joseph Arthur Vigneron and Andre Vigneron.
