= Bernard Millant =

French bow maker, archetier and luthier

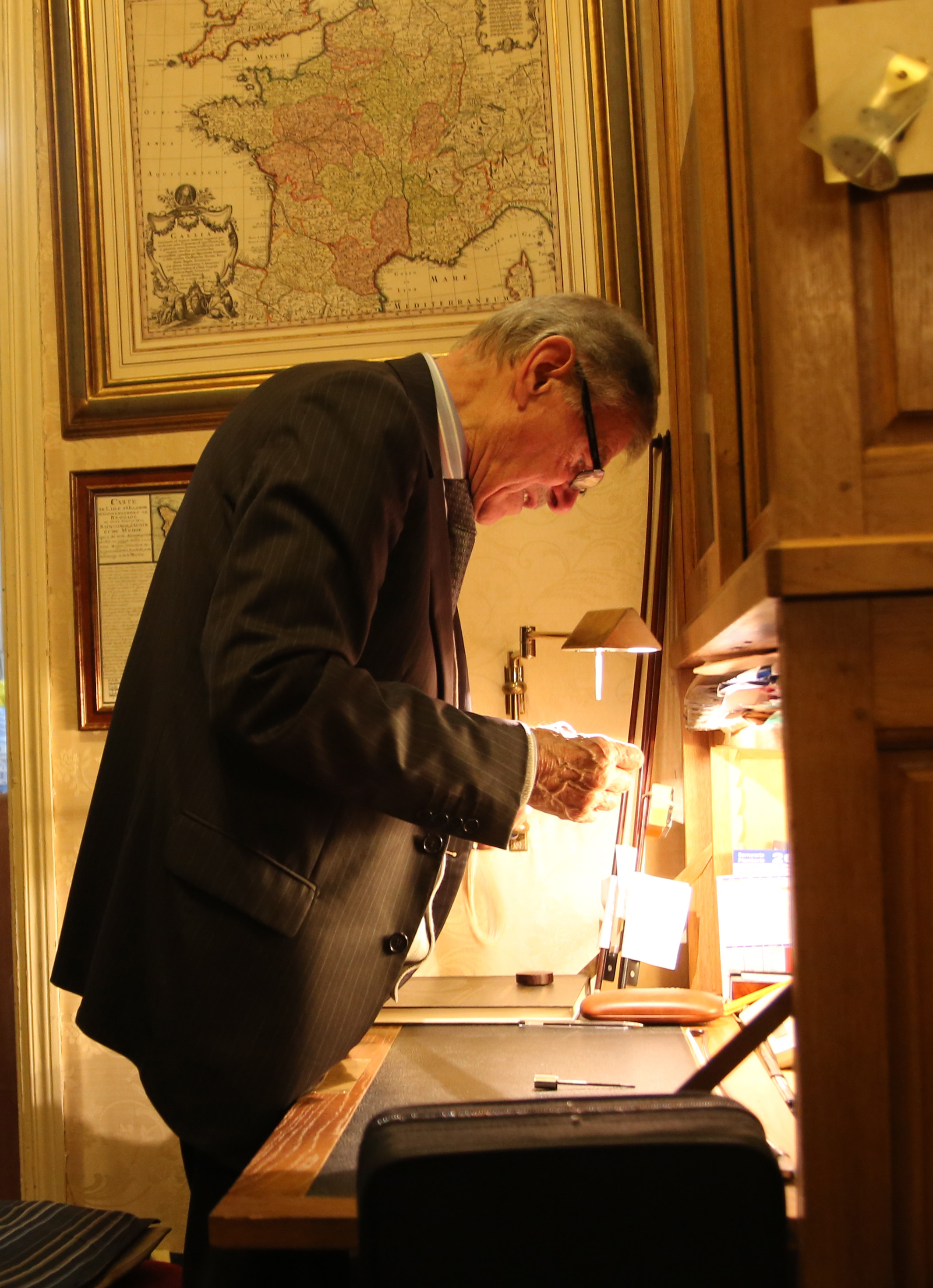
Bernard Millant inspecting a bow at the Le Canu Millant shop in Paris, France

Bernard Millant (1929 – 5 April 2017) was a bow maker, archetier and luthier in Paris, France. He was the son of Max Millant. He studied violin-making at Amédée Dieudonné's workshop in Mirecourt. He also studied bow-making with Louis Morizot alongside the Morizot Frères. He is known as an expert for his reliable certificates for fine French bows, and was the author of the definitive book on French bows: Millant, Bernard; Raffin, Jean Francois (2000). L'Archet. Paris: L'Archet Éditions. ISBN 2-9515569-0-X.
