= Jean-Delphin Alard =

French violinist and composer (1815–1888)

Background information
- Born: 8 March 1815; Bayonne, France
- Died: 22 February 1888 (age 72) Paris, France
- Genre: Classical
- Occupations: Pedagogue, violinist
- Instrument: Violin

Jean-Delphin Alard (8 March 1815 – 22 February 1888) was a French violinist, composer, and teacher. He was the son-in-law of Jean-Baptiste Vuillaume, and Pablo de Sarasate was one of his students.

== Biography ==
Alard was born in Bayonne, the son of an amateur violinist. From 1827 he was a pupil of F. A. Habeneck at the Paris Conservatoire, where he succeeded Pierre Baillot as professor in 1843, retaining the post till 1875. He was also a pupil of François-Joseph Fétis.

From 1831, he also pursued a career as an instrumentalist—first in the Opera orchestra, then as the King's first violinist. Napoleon III appointed him principal soloist of the Chapelle Impériale in 1858.

His playing was full of fire and point, and his compositions had a great success in France, while his violin school had a wider vogue and considerably greater value. He was a representative of the modern French school of violin playing, composed nocturnes, duets, études, etc., for the violin, and was the author of an Ecole du violon, which was adopted by the Conservatoire. Mention should also be made of his edition in 40 parts of a selection of violin compositions by the most eminent masters of the 18th century, Les Maitres classiques du violon (Schott). Alard died in Paris.

== Notes ==
=== References ===
- Chisholm, Hugh, ed. (1911). "Alard, Jean Delphin" . Encyclopædia Britannica. Vol. 1 (11th ed.). Cambridge University Press. p. 470.
