= François Peccatte =

French archetier / bow maker (1821 - 1855)

François Peccatte (10 March 1821 in Mirecourt – 30 October 1855 in Paris) was an archetier. He died at the age of 34 before reaching the height of his craft. He was the brother of Dominique Peccatte and father to Charles Peccatte.

Peccatte went to Paris for a short period early in his working life, then returned to Mirecourt and opened a shop in 1842, employing several workers to assist in his commercial production. François had some association with his brother Dominique, presumably during his stay in Paris and again when Dominique returned to Mirecourt.

"Indeed, much of François’ best work shows the strong influence of Dominique".

"François Peccatte, was also a fine bow maker who worked in Mirecourt. He returned to Paris not long before his premature death."
