= François Tourte =

French bow maker (1747–1835)

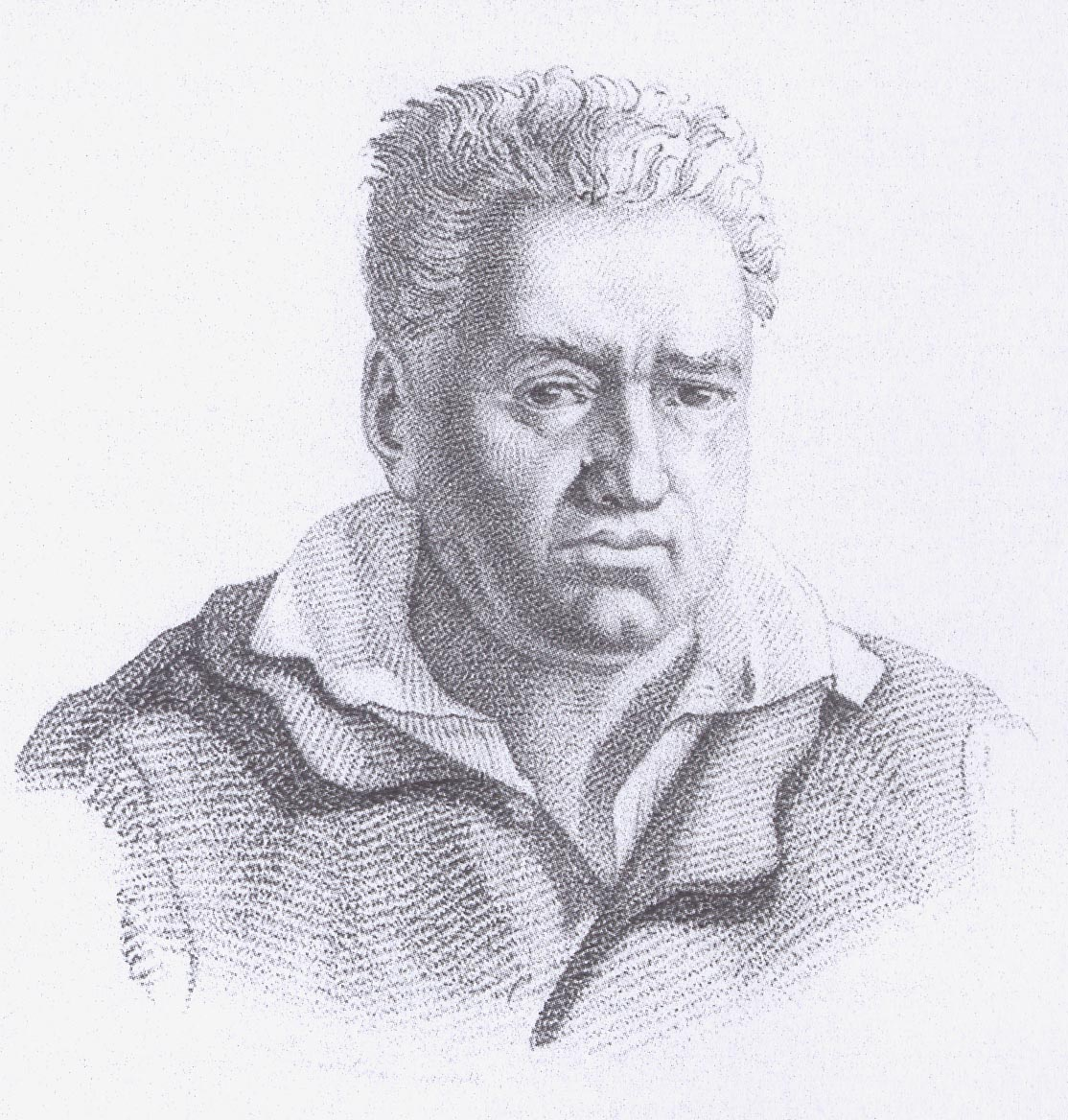
Engraving of François Xavier Tourte, J. Frey, 1818

François Xavier Tourte (1747 – 25 April 1835) was a French bow maker who made a number of significant contributions to the development of the bow of stringed instruments, and is considered to be the most important figure in the development of the modern bow. Because of this, he has often been called the Stradivari of the bow.

== Development of the Modern Bow ==
Tourte spent eight years as a watchmaker's apprentice before finally becoming an apprentice to his luthier father, Nicolas Pierre Tourte père (c.1700 - 1764). After his father's death, Tourte, in collaboration with the violin virtuoso G. B. Viotti, made important changes in the form of the bow in the Classical period between 1785 and 1790.

Tourte's bows are made from pernambuco wood, the most usual form of wood used on professional bows today. Tourte's bows tended to be heavier than previous models, with more wood at the tip of the bow counterbalanced by a heavier frog (the device connecting the hair to the stick at the end nearest the player's hand).

They generally have a usable hair-length of around 65 cm, and the balance point is 19 cm from the frog. The bows were elegantly fluted through half, or sometimes the whole, of their length. The curve in the wood was created by heating the wood thoroughly and then bending it. Before Tourte, bows had been cut to the desired bend. The final important change credited to Tourte is the screw in the frog (or nut) to moderate the tension in the hair. This propelling and withdrawing screw is found on virtually all modern violin bows. He is also credited with the invention of the spreader block, which fixes the hair of the bow in a flat ribbon, and so prevents tangling.

At the height of his career, a single Tourte bow fetched 15 Louis d'Or. Tourte destroyed any bow that was not entirely faultless before it left his workshop. He never varnished his bows but only rubbed them with pumice powder and oil. The Tourte pattern was followed by Dominique Peccatte, Jacob Eury, Nicolas Maire, François Lupot, Nicolas Maline, Joseph Henry and Jean Pierre Marie Persois.

== How the Tourte Bow Affected Technique ==
The Tourte Bow's weight, hair tension, and length led to many experiments and discussions among musicians to determine which bow was better and how the applied techniques were either affected or had to change to produce the best sound out of the instrument. There are many techniques that stayed the same or had very little difference in sound quality, but here are some that some adjustments.

Legato strokes were able to be much longer and smoother and the tension in the Tourte bow allowed for the sound to be more consistent dynamically. Détaché was cause of many disagreements regarding which bow is better for the technique. Some say the Pre-Tourte bow produces a more articulated sound on separated strokes, while others claim that because of the weight difference in the bows, the Tourte bow projects much more. Martelé used to be very difficult to achieve do to the lack of flat hair that could make contact with the string. Since the addition of the ferrule, the bow holds the hairs flat so that there is more surface area creating a sound, allowing for the full sound required by the martelé technique. Spiccato and Sautillé are both strokes that rely on the rebound of the strings and the wood itself. Several musicians that played with both Pre-Tourte and Tourte bows claim that the sound quality and ease of the stroke was higher with the additions that the Tourte bows had. While these are just some of the opinions of musicians from that time, their statements do hold some truth due to the curvature of the wood and the flexibility that Tourte brought to the bow.

== Quotes ==
"The French bow maker François-Xavier Tourte, more commonly known as François Tourte or Tourte le jeune, is often referred to as 'the inventor of the modern bow,' or 'the Stradivari of the bow.' His bows, dating from the end of the eighteenth century and the early decades of the nineteenth, had a marked effect upon the timbre of violins and upon performance practice, enabling new forms of expression and articulation to be developed, and in particular, facilitating the increased use of legato. François Joseph Fétis's entry in the second, expanded edition of his Biographie Universelle des Musiciens et Bibliographie Générale de la Musique (1860–65) has until recently been the only source of biographical information about François Tourte. Some thirty documents recently discovered in French archives provide further fresh insight into this maker's life and work." Stewart Pollens, Metropolitan Museum of Art, New York

"Tourte - French family of bowmakers and luthiers. It comprised of Nicolas Pierre Tourte and his sons Nicolas Léonard and François Xavier and perhaps Charles Tourte, son of Nicolas Léonard. In addition, at least two channelled (canalé) bows dating from about 1750–60 exist bearing the brand-stamp A.TOURTE." - Paul Childs

== Bibliography ==
- Childs, Paul, "(3) François Xavier Tourte ", Grove Music Online (accessed 6 August 2017). (subscription required)
- François-Xavier Tourte - Bow Maker by Stewart Pollens and Henryk Kaston with M.E.D. Lang, 2001 (Tourte's background, his working life and bow-making techniques.)
- Roda, Joseph (1959). Bows for Musical Instruments. Chicago: W. Lewis. OCLC 906667.
- Vatelot, Étienne (1976). Les Archet Francais. Sernor: M. Dufour. OCLC 2850939.
- Raffin, Jean-François; Millant, Bernard (2000). L'Archet. Paris: L'Archet Éditions. ISBN 2-9515569-0-X.
- Dictionnaire Universel del Luthiers - Rene Vannes 1951,1972, 1985 (vol.3)
- Universal Dictionary of Violin & Bow Makers - William Henley 1970
- L'Abbé Sibire: La chélonomie, ou Le parfait luthier (Paris, 1806, repr. 1823/R, rev. 1885 by L. de Pratis)
- F.-J. Fétis: Antoine Stradivari, luthier célèbre (Paris, 1856; Eng. trans., 1864/R)
- TOURTE LE JEUNE - London 2008 Exhibition (organized by Paul Childs)- Catalogue for the Tourte exhibition, the Royal Academy of Music, November 2008. Hard-bound, 60 pages with illustrations of 35 François Tourte bows and 15 contemporary copies. Published by The Magic Bow Publications
