= René Vannes =

Belgian musicologist (1888 - 1956)

René Vannes (24 May 1888 in Lille, France – 19 November 1956 in Brussels) was a Belgian musicologist and author of a standard history of lutenists, which is also used as a standard reference work on violin bow makes and archetiers.

== Selected works ==
Universal Dictionary of Luthiers

- Essai d'un dictionnaire universel des luthiers, Marne (1932) OCLC 3199810, 504613360, 462354286
- Dictionnaire universel des luthiers, revised Vol. 1, Brussels (1951) OCLC 521793611
- Dictionnaire universel des luthiers, revised Vol. 2, Brussels (1959) OCLC 993024
- Dictionnaire universel des luthiers, 2 volumes in 1: 1951 & 1959, Brussels (1979) OCLC 654915609
- Dictionnaire universel des luthiers, revised 2nd edition (two volumes) (1986) OCLC 152724619
- Dictionnaire universel des luthiers, (two volumes) Brussels 1988 OCLC 491895848

Other books

- Essai de terminologie musicale ou dictionnaire universel, Paris: Max Eschig OCLC 3711352
- Une pianiste alsacienne, Marie de Moroguès-Kiené, Paris 1927, Colmar
- Dictionnaire des musiciens Belges (compositeurs) du XIV au XX siècle (Dictionary of Musicians and Composers, Belgium, 14th Century to the 20th Century), Brussels: Larcier (1947) OCLC 458393528

== See also ==
- Category:Lutherie reference books
