= Dominique Peccatte =

French bow maker (1810–1874)

Dominique Peccatte stamp

Dominique Peccatte (15 July 1810 – 13 January 1874) was a French luthier and above all a renowned bow maker. He was apprenticed in Mirecourt and later worked with Jean-Baptiste Vuillaume.

He is notable for adapting the "hatchet-shaped" type head — a model arrived at by Tourte — and is considered one of the most influential bow makers. His brother François Peccatte and nephew Charles Peccatte were also remarkable bow-makers. Peccatte’s two best-known pupils were Joseph Henry and Pierre Simon. He also purportedly taught François Xavier Bazin.

== Biography ==
Apprenticed to a violin maker in Mirecourt, Peccatte soon worked in the workshop of Vuillaume, from 1826 to 1837. Here he studied with Jean Pierre Marie Persois, and also met François Tourte. Like François Nicolas Voirin, his early bows were sometimes stamped "VUILLAUME A PARIS". By 1838 he had taken over the workshop of François Lupot, after assisting him from 1836 (the younger brother of violin maker Nicolas Lupot). He returned to Mirecourt in 1848, after which his shop was taken over by Pierre Simon, who partnered with Joseph Henry until 1851.

Although the majority of his bows were not branded, Peccatte used a singular brand, "PECCATTE" throughout his mature period.

=== Quotes ===
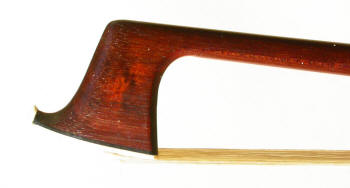
The Peccatte "Hatchet-shaped" head

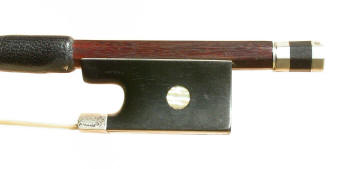
Dominique Peccatte bow

"Some consider his bows second only to those of Tourte. His brother François (1820-1855), was also a fine bow maker who worked in Mirecourt." - Gennady Filimonov

"Dominique Peccatte, (who is presumed to have learned his craft with Persoit, and apparently worked in the Lupot atelier as well, before a stint in the Vuillaume workshop) continued the trend with a bow patterned after Tourte’s strongest, heaviest model. The Peccatte concept for a bow was generally heavier than anything before him in France, and his output was vast and consistent. If not as flexible as earlier bows, Peccatte bows are still fairly flexible; the increase in weight from earlier concepts makes Peccatte bows well suited to the production of the volume of sound and degree of articulation appropriate to large, modern concert halls (of his time). The Peccatte bow is one, but not the only, ideal compromise in terms of tone production and handling. Although it neither produces the beauty of tone of a Tourte, nor handles with the nimbleness of a Nicolaus Kittel, a fine Peccatte does everything it must do very well, and with a thick rich sonority. Peccatte’s two best known pupils were Joseph Henry and Pierre Simon."
