= William Henley (violinist) =

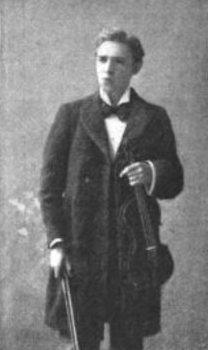
- In The Sketch, 23 March 1898
- Born: 28 January 1874; West Bromwich
- Died: 13 April 1957 (aged 83); Kew, London
- Occupation(s): Violinist, composer, educator

William Henley (1874–1957) was an English violinist, arranger of music, music teacher, and composer.

== Biography ==
William Henley was born at West Bromwich on January 28, 1874, (Note: Some sources give a birth year of 1876.) and started playing the violin under his father John, (Note: An article in the Walsall Observer of 3 January 1931, states that Henley’s first lessons were given by a Joseph Clements of Walsall.) at the age of six. After studying under him for five years, Henley studied with Mr. T. M. Abbott, of Birmingham. His first concert tour in 1886 was through Gloucestershire and the Forest of Dean, where he was announced as the "boy Paganini". In 1887 he became leader of the band that accompanied D'Oyly Carte's No. 1 Company to the principal towns of France.

In October, 1888, he went on a tour through Lancashire with H. T. Bywater. When performing in Birmingham in 1889, he came into contact with Councillor Beale, who was a musical enthusiast and suggested Henley should go to London for violin lessons, and kindly provided him with the means to continue his musical studies there. After studying the violin for two years with Henry Holmes, during which time he also studied theory of music under T. J. Woodall, of West Bromwich, and afterwards with Ben Nock, of Smethwick, he had a course of lessons from Willy Hess, once leader of Sir Charles Hallé’s Band. Hess again took an interest in Henley's career and requested him to accept the post of principal second violin in Hallé's orchestra, on the death of Mr. Harmer. However, all offers for orchestral playing were rejected, and Hess could not persuade the young Henley to leave Birmingham. In 1893 he continued his studies with Emile Sauret, Professor at the Royal Academy of Music, but it was not until the young Henley left Birmingham, and went to London to study with August Wilhelmj, that he began to make his name felt throughout England. Henley was a frequent guest of Wilhelmj, and led a string quartet, with Wilhelmj playing second violin. Owing to Henley's success Wilhelmj agreed to teach Henley for free. Henley was dubbed "The English Paganini" by critics of the day.

Henley later became a professor of composition and principal of the violin at the Royal Academy of Music in London.

The seminal reference book the Universal Dictionary of Violin & Bow Makers is based on his notes. The book was the first to include a significant number of American craftsmen. Henley travelled extensively as a performer, primarily with his quartet. His quartet, organised in 1907, consisted of Henley, Gertrude Crompton, James Lockyer and Gertrude Ess. It was during his trips, including a trip to America during the 1920s, that he gathered information for his book.

He died at his home on Kent Road, Kew on the 13 April 1957, aged 83.
