= Jean-Baptiste Vuillaume =

French luthier and inventor (1798–1875)

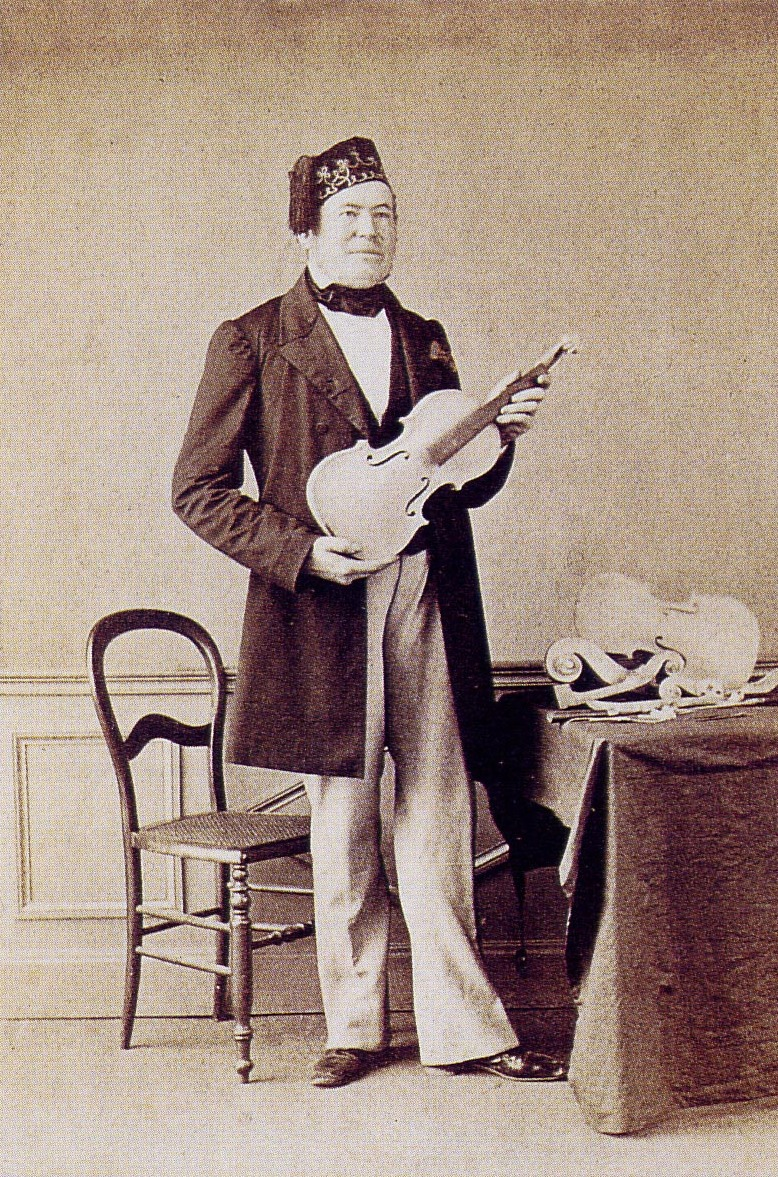
- Vuillaume in 1860
- Born: 7 October 1798; Mirecourt, France
- Died: 19 March 1875 (aged 76); Paris, France
- Education: Claude François Vuillaume; François Chanot
- Known for: Luthier; entrepreneur; inventor; musical-instrument connoisseur
- Notable work: Il Cannone Copy (1834); Sun-Law (1855); Le Messie Copy
- Style: J.B. Vuillaume style; Stradivarius style; Guarneri style; Maggini style; Da Salò style; Amati style
- Movement: French school; Mirecourt school
- Spouse: Adèle Guesnet (m. 1826)
- Awards: List of Awards: Silver medal – French Industrial Exposition 1827; Silver medal – French Industrial Exposition 1834; Gold medal – French Industrial Exposition 1844; Gold medal – French Industrial Exposition 1849; Council medal – International London Exhibition 1851; Gold medal – Paris International Exhibition 1855

Jean-Baptiste Vuillaume (French pronunciation: [ʒɑ̃ batist vɥijom]; 7 October 1798 – 19 March 1875) was a French luthier, businessman, inventor and winner of many awards.

He was one of the finest French luthiers of the 19th century and a key figure in the world of violin making. His workshop made more than 3,000 instruments. His vision was the ethics and beauty of the Cremona school.

== Early life ==
Vuillaume was born in Mirecourt, where his father and grandfather were luthiers. His father taught him the basics of violin making.

== Career ==
Vuillaume moved to Paris in 1818 to work for François Chanot. In 1821, he joined the workshop of Simon Lété, François-Louis Pique's son-in-law, at Rue Pavée St. Sauveur. His first labels are dated 1823.

Lété and Vuillaume became partners and in 1825 settled in the Rue Croix-des-Petits-Champs under the name of "Lété et Vuillaume".

In 1827, at the height of the Neo-Gothic period, he started to make imitations of old instruments, some of which were identical to the originals.

In 1827, Vuillaume won a silver medal at the Paris Universal Exhibition. The following year, he started his own business at 46 Rue Croix des Petits-Champs. His workshop became the most important in Paris and within twenty years, it led Europe.

He won various gold medals in the competitions of the Paris Universal Exhibitions in 1839, 1844, and 1855. In 1851, he won the Council Medal in London was awarded the Legion of Honour.

In 1855, Vuillaume purchased 144 instruments made by Italian master luthiers, including the Messiah Stradivarius and 24 other Stradivari. He bought them for 80,000 francs from the heirs of Luigi Tarisio, an Italian tradesman.

In 1858, in order to avoid Paris customs duty on wood imports, he moved to Rue Pierre Demours near the Ternes, outside the city.

A maker of more than 3,000 instruments—almost all of which are numbered—and a fine tradesman, Vuillaume was also a gifted inventor, as his research in collaboration with the acoustics expert Félix Savart demonstrates. He developed many new instruments and mechanisms, most notably a large viola which he called a "contralto", and the three-string Octobass (1849–51), a huge triple bass standing 3.48 metres high.

He also created the hollow steel bow (particularly appreciated by Charles de Bériot), and the 'self-rehairing' bow. For the latter, hair purchased in prepared hanks could be inserted by the player in the time it takes to change a string, and was tightened or loosened by a simple mechanism inside the frog. The frog itself was fixed to the stick, and the balance of the bow thus remained constant when the hair stretched with use.

He also designed a round-edged frog mounted to the butt by means of a recessed track, which he encouraged his bowmakers to use; other details of craft make it possible to identify the actual maker of many Vuillaume bows. The bows are stamped, often rather faintly, either "vuillaume à paris" or "j.b. vuillaume".

Other innovations include the insertion of Stanhopes in the eye of the frogs of his bows, a kind of mute (the pédale sourdine) and several machines, including one for manufacturing gut strings of perfectly equal thickness.

Many of the great bow makers of the 19th century collaborated with his workshop. Jean Pierre Marie Persois, Jean Adam, Dominique Peccatte, Nicolas Rémy Maire, François Peccatte, Nicolas Maline, Joseph Henry, Pierre Simon, François Nicolas Voirin, Charles Peccatte, Charles Claude Husson, Joseph Fonclause, Jean Joseph Martin, and Prosper Colas are among the most celebrated.

Vuillaume was an innovative violin maker and restorer, and a tradesman who traveled Europe in search of instruments. Most instruments by the great Italian violin makers passed through his workshop, where Vuillaume took accurate measurements of their dimensions and made copies of them.

He drew his inspiration from two violin makers and their instruments: Antonio Stradivari and his "Le Messie" (Messiah), and Giuseppe Guarneri del Gesù and his "Il Cannone" which belonged to Niccolò Paganini; others such as Maggini, Da Salò and Nicola Amati were also imitated, but to a lesser extent.

Vuillaume made numerous copies of his favorite violin "Le Messie", the more noteworthy among them being:

Instrument Number	Date	Comments
#1952	c. 1853	"The Blade", ex-Kägi
#2236	c. 1860	
#2374	c. 1861	
#2455	c. 1863	
#2455	c. 1863	
#2509	c. 1863	It was sold off in auction after J.B.V.'s death.
#2541	c. 1864	
#2556	c. 1864	Now to be found in the Musee d'Art in Geneve, with carved boxwood pegs and tail piece-the same which Vuillaume fitted to the original instrument.
#2594	c. 1865	
A fine copy without number	c. 1868, ex-Jules Garcin	After Jules Garcin, it belonged to David Laurie and then belonged to Wurlitzer, and William Lewis and Son of Chicago.
#2936	c. 1873	
#2952	c. 1873	
#2963	c. 1873	

Vuillaume was able to craft such a perfect replica of "Il Cannone", that upon viewing them side by side, Paganini was unable to tell which was the original. He was able to recognize the master instrument only upon hearing subtle differences in tone during playing.

The copy violin was eventually passed on to Paganini's only student, Camillo Sivori. Sivori owned great violins by Nicolò Amati, Stradivari, and Bergonzi, but the Vuillaume was his favourite. This violin is owned by the Musei Di Genova and displayed in their Palazzo Tursi.

When making these copies, Vuillaume always remained faithful to the essential qualities of the instruments he imitated – their thickness, the choice of the woods, and the shape of the arching. The only differences, always the result of a personal decision, were the colour of the varnish, the height of the ribs or the length of the instruments.

His most beautiful violins were often named after the people who owned them (Caraman de Chimay, Cheremetoff, Doria)

Vuillaume occasionally named his instruments: twelve were named after birds, for example the "Golden Pheasant", "The Thrush" and twelve were named after the apostles such as "St. Joseph" and "Saint Paul". A few others were also named after important biblical characters "The Evangelists" and Millant, in his book on Vuillaume, mentions a "St. Nicholas".

The ‘St Nicolas’ was made in 1872 as one of his Apostles series. In a letter from September 11 1872, Vuillaume wrote to Nikolai Haller (Nicolas de Haller): ‘I have received your good letter of the 23rd, which tells me of the preference you have for Stradivarius. So I have therefore finished the instrument, over which I have taken great care, especially for you. As for the few extraordinary instruments I have made, I have given them names in order to distinguish each one. The one intended for you is the St Nicolas. I hope it will have an effect upon your music lovers. I don’t think I have made a better or more complete one. The wood, the work and varnish are all splendid. As for the tone, you will judge for yourself. I hope it will give you as much pleasure in receiving it as I have had in offering it to you. I think it will not suffer in comparison to your magnificent instruments of the great masters!’ The letter is addressed to ‘Nicolas de Haller’, the ‘de’ prefix being used to honour the Russian’s noble lineage. The ‘St Nicolas’ is labelled: ‘Jean Baptiste Vuillaume a Paris,3 rue Demours Ternes, JBV’. Inscribed on the label are the words Dédié a M. Nicolas de Haller, 1872. Vuillaume even included a very special note along with his signature on the upper back: Exprès pour M. Nicolas de Haller 1872 (made especially for Mr. de Haller 1872). The instrument was gifted to Nikolai Haller by Vuillaume as a thank you gesture for purchasing a big collection of rare string instruments (which included the Bass of Spain by Antonio Stradivari).

A rare violin by Vuillaume (c. 1874, Paris) showcases inlaid ebony fleur-de-lys designs and is one of the last instruments to come out of Vuillaume's workshop, made a year before his death. Crafted for the famous violin dealer David Laurie, "Label reads: Jean Baptiste Vuillaume a Paris, 3 Rue Demour-Ternes, expres pour mon ami David Laurie, 1874", numbered 2976 and signed on the label. It's a copy of a Nicolò Amati violin originally belonging to Prince Nikolai Borisovich Yusupov (junior) (a Russian aristocrat and pupil of Henri Vieuxtemps). Only six copies were made.

He also had practice violins, known as "St. Cécile violins", made by his brother Nicolas de Mirecourt. Another lesser line, also made by Nicolas, was labelled "Stentor".

His main contribution to violin-making was his work on varnish. The purfling's joints are often cut on the straight and not on the bias as was traditional, in the middle in the pin. His brand is burnt at a length of 1 cm. There is generally a black dot on the joint of the top under the bridge. He used an external mould. The stop is generally 193 mm long. In this respect he follows to the French 18th-century tradition of a short stop (190 mm), which was traditionally 195 mm long in Italy and even 200 mm long in Germany. The violin's serial number is inscribed in the middle inside the instrument. Its date (only the last two figures) in the upper paraph on the back. His violins of the first period have large edges and his brand was then burnt inside the middle bouts. The varnish varied from orange-red to red. After 1860, his varnish became lighter.

In addition to the above-mentioned bow makers, most 19th-century Parisian violin makers worked in his workshop, including Hippolyte Silvestre, Jean-Joseph Honoré Derazey, Charles Buthod, Charles-Adolphe Maucotel, Télesphore Barbé, Paul Bailly and George Gemünder.

Nestor Audinot, a pupil of Sébastien Vuillaume, himself Jean-Baptiste's nephew, succeeded him in his workshop in 1875. Vuillaume died at the height of his career, widely regarded as the pre-eminent luthier of his day.

== World-record price ==
- London, 30 October 2012 – Sotheby's: GBP 145,250 (US$231,160) – "Saint Paul" J. B. Vuillaume violin copy of the "Messiah" Stradivarius, Paris, circa 1870
- London, 28 March 2013 – Bromptons: GBP 162,000 (US$251,619) – J. B. Vuillaume, Paris, circa 1860, after Stradivarius
- London, 30 October 2013 – Tarisio Auctions, London: GBP 163,200 (US$262,275) – J. B. Vuillaume violin, Paris
- London, 22 October 2019 – Tarisio Auctions: GBP 350,000 (US$452,380, EUR 406,291) – J. B. Vuillaume cello copy of the "Duport" Stradivarius, Paris, 1845
- London, 8 June 2021 – Ingles & Hayday: £384,000 (US$533,597) – "Tsar Nicholas"; ex-Stern violin by J.B. Vuillaume, Paris, circa 1840-41

== Specimen labels ==
- J.B. Vuillaume No. 4, Chez N.A. Lété rue Pavée-Saint-Sauveur no. 20 á Paris 1823
- Jean Baptiste Vuillaume á Paris, rue Croix des Petits Champs
- Jean Baptiste Vuillaume á Paris, 3 rue Demours-Ternes

The signature is usually followed by a doubly encircled JBV (J&B are joined). Early on, it was doubly encircled JBV. The labels at "Rue Croix Petits Champs" began using the doubly encircled JBV (J&B joined), which remained the same on "3. rue Demours-Ternes" labels. In addition, most specimens have a number associated with them.

== Awards and medals ==
- In 1827, Silver medal at the French Industrial Exposition of 1827
- In 1834, Silver medal at the French Industrial Exposition of 1834
- In 1844, Gold medal at the French Industrial Exposition of 1844
- In 1849, Gold medal at the French Industrial Exposition of 1849
- In 1851, Council medal at the Great Exhibition in London for "new modes of making violins, in such a manner that they are matured and perfected immediately on the completion of the manufacture, thus avoiding the necessity of keeping them for considerable periods to develop their excellencies"
- In 1855, Gold medal at the Paris International Exhibition

== The Vuillaume family ==
- Jean Vuillaume – ancestor of Jean-Baptiste. His historicity is disputed as a fabrication of Jean-Baptiste who may have been trying to create a mythology of family descendants going far back to Italy.
- Claude Vuillaume – oldest family member, a lute maker
- Claude François Vuillaume I (1730–1770)
- Charles François Vuillaume (1755–1779 – particularly known for his workmanship and the mellow and responsive tone of his instruments
- Claude François Vuillaume II (1772–1834) – father of the Jean-Baptiste
- Charles-Francois Vuillaume II (born 1797) – eldest son of Claude François Vuillaume II
- Jean-Baptiste Vuillaume (1798–1875)
- Nicolas Vuillaume (1800–1871) – third son of Claude François Vuillaume II. Made wonderful, high quality instruments in Mirecourt. He would ship some of his instruments to Paris to be later completed by Jean-Baptiste Vuillaume and sold at J.B. Vuillaume’s Paris shop. He also made a brand of instruments called 'Stentor'.
- Nicolas François Vuillaume (1802–1876) – fourth son of Claude François Vuillaume II. The most important luthier of the Vuillaume family next only to his brother Jean-Baptiste. Established his own workshop, with a fine reputation, in Brussels.
- Joseph François Vuillaume (1804–1856) – worked in Mirecourt, then Paris, and finally Lyon.
- Claude-François Vuillaume (1807–1853) – fifth son of Claude François Vuillaume II, father of Sébastien
- Sébastian Vuillaume (1835–1875) – nephew of Jean-Baptiste, worked with his uncle during the golden period
- Vuillaume, Gustave Eugène – born at Mirecourt 1899. Pupil of Mougenot and Jacquent Gand. Workmanship and general appearance qualify this maker as successful in Guarnerian modelling. Oil varnish typically of clear yellow to dark reddish brown.

== Players ==
- Charles Auguste de Bériot (1802–1870)
- Camillo Sivori (1815–1894), played on a Vuillaume copy of Paganini's "Il Cannone" (which Paganini gave to him).
- Ole Bull (1810–1880)
- Ricardo Cyncynates (1961), 1873 "The David"
- Ferdinand David (1810–1873)
- Jean-Delphin Alard (1815–1888)
- Henri Vieuxtemps (1820–1881) c.1874 (now known as ex-Vieuxtemps)
- Jules Garcin (1830–1896) copy of "Le Messie" (Messiah) Stradivari 1868 without number.
- Joseph Joachim (1831–1907)
- Sophie Humler (1841-1918) ex-Sophie Humler copy of Stradivari 1863
- Eugène Ysaÿe (1858–1931)
- Josef Suk (1874–1935)
- Fritz Kreisler (1875–1962)
- Jacques Thibaud (1880–1953)
- Naoum Blinder (1889–1965) ex-Blinder 1845-50
- Albert Spalding (1888-1953) copy of "Il Cannone" (now known as ex-Spalding), owned by Philip Ruder, now Dan Flanagan
- Efrem Zimbalist (1889–1985)
- Jack Benny (1894–1974) now known as the ex-Jack Benny 1845
- Nina Dolce (Georgina Springer) (1897-d.?) ex-Hamma 1828
- Toscha Seidel (1899–1962) copy of the Alard Strad 1860 (now known as ex-Seidel)
- Louis Kaufman (1905–1994) copy of "La Pucelle" Stradivari #1489 c.1839
- Nathan Posner (collector Beverly Hills, California) (?-1962) ex-Chimay viola 1865 and ex-Sophie Humler 1863
- Pierre Fournier (1906–1986) ex-'Count Doria' cello 1863
- Ruggiero Ricci (1918–2012)
- Marinus Snoeren (1919–1982), played on the Vuillaume Cello, currently in hands of Rien Snoeren
- Adolph F. Schrader (Chicago), American, Violinist played on the ex-Garcin 1868 also another Strad copy of 1860 #2390
- Henryk Szeryng (1918–1988) Messiah Strad copy which he gave to Prince Sovereign Rainier III of Monaco
- Isaac Stern (1920–2001) A copy of the "Stern, ex Panette" Guarneri del Gesu of 1737 (c. 1850) also ex-Nicolas I of 1840
- Arthur Grumiaux (1921–1986) 1866 (now known as ex-Grumiaux) now played by Jennifer Koh
- Josef Hassid (1923–1950) ex-Kreisler
- Endre Granat (1937) Guarneri copy 1866
- Patrice Fontanarosa (1942)
- Jean Etienne Drouet (1942–1990) ex-Drouet 1827 No.73" and labelled "Antonius Stradivarius Cremonensis Faciebat Anno 1706"
- Pinchas Zukerman (1948)
- Young-Uck Kim ex-Paganini; ex-Kreisler 1860
- André Rieu (1949)
- Oliver Jaques (Zurich) ex-Nicolas I:ex-Isaac Stern 1840
- Stewart Eaton (English, Violist) 'Count Doria' viola 1848
- Barry Hou ex-Zukerman
- Laszlo Sirsom (1953)
- Chin Kim (1957) plays on 1843 Stradivari model
- Richard Hendrix (1958) plays an early Cannone copy made in 1828.
- Mark O'Connor (1961) plays an 1830s Vuillaume
- Ingolf Turban (1964)
- Gennady Filimonov (196?) played on the ex-Garcin Vuillaume
- Cihat Aşkın (1968)
- Giovanni Radivo (1969)
- Alexander Kerr (1970)
- Michael Jelden (1971)
- Manrico Padovani (1973) plays on a Vuillaume 1870 (copy of the Strad Messiah) and on a Vuillaume 1845 (copy of 'Il Cannone' Guarnerius of 1743)
- Tiffany Wu (1978)
- Hilary Hahn (1979) plays on the ex- Lande of 1864 (copy of 'Il Cannone' Guarnerius of 1743)
- Catherine Manoukian (1981), plays on the ex-Ysaÿe Vuillaume
- Myvanwy Ella Penny (1984)
- Nemanja Radulovic (1985) plays a J.B. Vuillaume violin from 1843.
- Pierre Fouchenneret (1985)
- Lorenzo Gatto (1986) plays a Jean Baptiste Vuillaume
- Vilde Frang (1986) plays on an 1864 Vuillaume
- Olga Kholodnaya (1987) plays on an 1853 Vuillaume "The Blade"
- Nadir Khashimov (1990) plays on an 1828 Vuillaume
- William Shaub (1992) plays on an 1865 Vuillaume
- Modigliani quartet (2003) plays on a J.B. Vuillaume string quartet "The Evangelists" (1863)
- Guillaume Latour (1981-) plays on a 1830 Vuillaume
- EnAccord String Quartet (1998) plays on 2 violins (1829) and a viola (1867) from J.B. Vuillaume
- Hsiao-mei Ku of the Ciompi Quartet performs on a violin made by J.B.Vuillaume
- Jagdish Mistry and Rafal Zambrzycki-Payne of Ensemble Modern both play on violins made by J.B. Vuillaume.
- Gabriel Voicu since 2019 owner of "ex-Hamma" Vuillaume after playing 26 years on his own "G. Voicu A. Stradivarius"
- YoungJung KIM(2023) certificated by YoungChan KIM
- Olgu Kızılay (1977) plays on a Vuillaume 1862

== Quotes ==
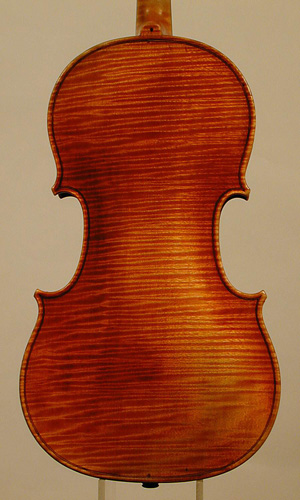
"Le Messie" Stradivarius 1860, back

What set him apart from the rest is that he was not only an artist without equal, but also a tireless seeker of perfection to whom there was no such thing as failure. It was this driving force which shone through his life and made his work immortal.

— Roger Millant, Paris 1972.

The makers of France and the Low Countries more or less followed Italian models, and during the past century there have been many excellent French copyists of Stradivari and Guarnieri; two of the best are noticed under Lupot and Vuillaume: besides these there have been Aldric, G. Chanot the elder, Silvestre, Maucotel, Mennegand, Henry, and Rambaux.

— George Grove, ed., A Dictionary of Music and Musicians

Together with Nicolas Lupot, Vuillaume is the foremost French stringed instrument maker and the most important of the Vuillaume family of luthiers

— E. Jaeger, curator of the Vuillaume exhibit in Cité de la Musique.

The names of Maucotel, Medard, Mennegand, Silvestre, and Derazay, and above all Vuillaume, must always shed an imperishable lustre upon the little town in the Vosges mountains.

— H. R. Haweis, Old Violins and Violin Lore

In 1775 Paolo contracted to sell these instruments [the 10 remaining from his father's workshop] and other things from his father's shop to Count Cozio di Salabue, one of the most important collectors in history; and although Paolo died before the transaction was concluded, Salabue acquired the instruments. Salabue kept the 'Messiah' until 1827, when he sold it to Luigi Tarisio, a fascinating character who, from small beginnings, built up an important business dealing in violins. However, Tarisio could not bear to part with this instrument. Instead, he made it a favorite topic of conversation, and intrigued dealers on his visits to Paris with accounts of this marvelous 'Salabue' violin, as it was then called, taking care, however, never to bring it with him. One day Tarisio was discoursing to Vuillaume on the merits of this unknown and marvelous instrument, when the violinist Delphin Alard, who was present, exclaimed: 'Then your violin is like the Messiah: one always expects him but he never appears' ('Ah, ça, votre violon est donc comme le Messie; on l'attend toujours, et il ne parait jamais'). Thus the violin was baptized with the name by which it is still known. Tarisio never parted with the violin and not until his death in 1854 had anyone outside Italy seen it. In 1855, Vuillaume was able to acquire it, and it remained with him, also until his death. Vuillaume guarded the 'Messiah' jealously, keeping it in a glass case and allowing no one to examine it. However, he did allow it to be shown at the 1872 Exhibition of Instruments in the South Kensington Museum, and this was its first appearance in England. After Vuillaume's death in 1875, the violin became the property of his two daughters and then of his son-in-law, the violinist Alard. After Alard's death in 1888, his heirs sold the 'Messiah' in 1890 to W.E. Hill and Sons on behalf of a Mr. R. Crawford of Edinburgh for 2,600 British pounds, at that time the largest sum ever paid for a violin.

— David D. Boyden, London 1969

Vuillaume's ideal, and by constant study and cultivation of his own rare natural powers of observation he acquired such an intimate knowledge and judgement of Stardivari's work in every detail, that he might almost be said to be better acquainted with the maker's instruments than the master himself. Vuillaume soon found the sale of violins, issued as new works without any semblance of antiquity, an unprofitable undertaking and, recognizing the growing demand in all parts of the world for instruments resembling the great works of Cremona, he determined to apply his great skill as a workman, and his extraordinary familiarity with Stradivari's models, to the construction of faithful copies of the greatmaster's works.

This was the foundation of his success, for the modern copies found a ready sale, and orders poured in upon Vuillaume from all parts of the world. These instruments, imitations though they were, had high intrinsic merit; and it is to be remembered that they were copies made from unrivaled models, with fidelity and care such as only a devoted worshipper and a great master of his art could attain. He spared no pains in striving after perfection in the quality of his materials, and he treated the obscure and difficult problem of the varnish (the secret of which, as applied by the old Italian masters, seems to have died with them) with a success which has probably not been equalled by any other maker since their time.

The number of these instruments bearing his name is enormous, upwards of two thousand five hundred being known to exist; and many of them he made throughout with his own hand.... and we have it on the best authority that every instrument was varnished by his own hand."

— W.E. Hill & Sons, London 1902

Jean Baptiste was born in Mirecourt, where he worked until he was 19. He then went to Paris where the influence of François Chanot led him to approach violin making in a scientific manner. This led to his study of acoustics, analyses of varnishes, and to experimentation of various kinds. He won many prizes and achieved recognition as the greatest technical genius of his time, surpassed in French violin making only by Nicolas Lupot.

— Smithsonian Institution

As to the numbering system, for the most part, his instruments were numbered. But the very fine copies especially those of 'Le Messie' Strad, Guarneri Del Gesu 'Canon' and Del Gesu 'David'(which Ferdinand David owned) and Maggini are without Number(s). According to Doring's tabulation (made between 1947 and 1961), Vuillaume made at least 78 instruments between the 1830s and 1874 that he did not recorded by number, that are "outstanding and magnificent.

— Gennady Filimonov, 2007
