= Étienne Vatelot =

French luthier (1925-2013)

- Born: 13 November 1925; Provins
- Died: 17 July 2013 (aged 87); Paris
- Occupation: Luthier

Étienne Vatelot (French: [etjɛn vatəlo]; 13 November 1925 – 13 July 2013) was a French luthier.

== Biography ==
Étienne Vatelot was the son of luthier Marcel Vatelot, who opened his workshop in 1909, and Jehane Lauxerrois. He attended high school at the Institution Notre-Dame de Sainte-Croix. In 1942, he began learning the craft of lutherie in his father’s workshop at 11 bis rue Portalis in Paris. He perfected his skills in Mirecourt with luthier Amédée-Dominique Dieudonné, in Paris in the workshop of Victor Quenoil, and later in New York at Rembert Wurlitzer Co. In 1949, he obtained the diploma of honor at the International Violin Competition of The Hague (Netherlands). In 1959 he was appointed expert witness by the Court of Appeal of Paris and succeeded his father.

Étienne Vatelot used to compare his profession to that of a doctor. He was renowned for his diagnostic capabilities. He adjusted the instruments of numerous international soloists whom he accompanied on tour, including the French violinist Ginette Neveu. During his career, he advised leading violinists including Yehudi Menuhin, Arthur Grumiaux, Isaac Stern, Anne-Sophie Mutter, as well as cellists such as Maurice Gendron, Yo-Yo Ma, and Mstislav Rostropovich, whom he had known since the 1960s. He advised the latter to buy the Duport Stradivarius cello which he had appraised. He convinced Yehudi Menuhin to resell his Soil Stradivarius, which he deemed unsuitable for his playing, to Itzhak Perlman. In 1973, he acquired a quartet of stringed instruments made from the same wood by luthier Jean-Baptiste Vuillaume and nicknamed "les Évangélistes". In 2009, he allowed the Swiss Global Artistic Foundation, a patron of the Modigliani quartet, to acquire les Évangélistes so that they could be played together.

In 1970, Étienne Vatelot created the national school of lutherie in Mirecourt. The luthier Jean-Jacques Rampal, son of the flautist Jean-Pierre Rampal and assistant to Étienne Vatelot, took over his workshop in 1998. Étienne Vatelot gave numerous lectures and is the author of a book on Archets français ("French bows"). A foundation in his name was created to support young luthiers and bow makers by giving them scholarships. With the participation of the Paris City Council, he created an international competition for violin and bow making.

== Distinctions ==
- Commandeur of the Légion d’honneur
- Officier of the Ordre national du Mérite
- Chevalier of the Palmes académiques
- Commandeur of the Ordre des Arts et des Lettres
- Commandeur de l'Order of Isabella the Catholic (after restoring the Stradivarius quartet of the Royal Palace of Madrid)

== See also ==
- Sound post
- Bow (music)
- Fingerboard
- Musée de la Lutherie et de l'Archèterie françaises
