= Universal Dictionary of Violin & Bow Makers =

Reference Book on Luthiers

The Universal Dictionary of Violin & Bow Makers is a widely cited reference work providing information on approximately 9,000 violin makers. The work is based on the extensive notes of violinist and composer William Henley (1874-1957). Henley had in his youth studied with August Wilhelmj, and later became a professor of composition and principal of the violin at the Royal Academy in London. Having played violins from many manufacturers, Henley sought to compile a comprehensive list evaluating violin and bow makers. After Henley's death in 1957, dealer Cyril Woodcock (1897–1980) completed and published the work based on Henley's unfinished notes. The work was first published in five volumes in 1959 and 1960, and republished in a single volume in 1973.

== Background ==
The book was the first to include a significant number of American craftsmen. Henley traveled extensively as a performer, primarily with his quartet. It was during his trips, including a supposed trip to America during the 1920s, that Henley gathered information for his book. Australian violin maker Alan Coggins and regular contributor to The Strad wrote an article in 2003 challenging the objectivity of Woodcock's editing, given, among other things, unsourced and possibly inflated descriptions of luthiers in the United States.

Nonetheless, the dictionary, at the time of publishing, was among several during the decade that complemented a seminal earlier lexicon, The Violin and Lute Makers From the Middle Ages to the Present, by Willibald Leo von Lütgendorff (1856–1937), published in 1922. Others included one by a Belgian musicologist René Vannes (1888–1956), compiled two editions of a Dictionary (1951 & 1959). Also, Chicago violinist Joseph Roda (1894–1963) compiled a seminal book with detailed illustrations by Gladys Mickel Bell (1901–1992) about bows and bow makers (1959). German luthier Fridolin Hamma (1881–1969) from Stuttgart compiled a book about German-made violins (1948; 1961) and a similar book about Italian-made violins (1964). Czech author Karel Jalovec (born 1892) compiled a books about Italian violin makers (1957), Bohemian (including Moravian and Slovak) violin makers (1959), German and Austrian violin makers (1967), and an Encyclopedia of violin makers (2 volumes; 1965). Dutch luthier Max Möller (1915–1985) from Amsterdam published a lexical work about the violin factories (North and South) (1955).

John Dilworth, a Twickenham-based luthier, wrote a comprehensive reference, published in 2012, The Brompton's Book of Violin & Bow Makers, John Milnes, editor.

== Selected editions ==
- Universal Dictionary of Violin and Bow Makers (5 Vols.) (1st ed.), by William Henley; managing editor, Cyril Woodcock (managing ed.), (4to), Brighton, Sussex: Amati Publishing Ltd. (1959) (paperback)

Vol. 1: "Aaben to Coq." (1959)
Vol. 2: "Corani to Guarnerius, Joseph" (1960)
Vol. 3: "Guarnerius, Joseph to Maucotel, Charles Adolphe" (1960)
Vol. 4 (1960)
Vol. 5 (1960)
Vol. 6 (1965)
Vol. 7: "Price Guide and Appendix" (1969) 104 pages, 16 plates, research by Julia Grey
"Supplement"(1969–1970)

- Universal Dictionary of Violin and Bow Makers (new ed.), by William Henley, Amati Publishing Ltd. (1973), 1,268 pages
