= Karol Szreter discography =

Discography of piano player Karol Szreter

Discography of a piano player Karol Szreter. Information in the article is a compilation of data from several sources.

Vox sides (1923-1926, mostly acoustic) recorded in Berlin, Vox-Haus, W.9, Potsdamer Str. 4.

Electrola sides (1927, electric) recorded in Berlin.

Odeon / Parlophone sides (1926-1933, electric) recorded in Berlin, Carl Lindström AG, SO.33, Schlesische Straße 26.

Released solo recordings are marked with a yellow background.

== Piano rolls ==
Number	Recording date	Title	Composer	External link to a transfer	Remarks
Animatic 59583	ca. 1925	Humoresque Op. 10 No. 5	Sergey Rachmaninov	Humoresque on YouTube	
Animatic 59589	ca. 1925	Tańce polskie Op. 37, No. 1	Ludomir Różycki		

== Acoustic recordings ==
=== 1921 ===
Matrix numbers	Recording date	Title	Composer	Other artists	Disc catalogue numbers	Size	External link to a transfer	Remarks
xxB 6679	ca. May 1921	Gli tre cicisbei ridicoli Nina: Siciliana	L. Vincenzo Ciampi, incorrectly attributed to Pergolesi arr. David Popper	Arnold Földesy (cello)	Odeon (Germany) XX 76230 Odeon (Germany) AA 53307 Odeon (Germany) O-6476 (AA 53307)	12"		Note the same piece as matrix 51177.
xxB 6682	ca. May 1921	Am Springbrunnen, Op. 20 No. 2	Karl Davidov	Arnold Földesy (cello)	Odeon (Germany) XX 76235 Odeon (Germany) AA 53308 Odeon (Germany) O-6476 (AA 53308)	12"		
xxB 6683, xxB 6684	ca. May 1921	Zigeunerweisen, Op. 20, No. 1	Pablo de Sarasate arr. Arnold Földesy	Arnold Földesy (cello)	Unreleased	12"		Recorded again on 23 January 1924, see below.

=== 1923 ===
Matrix numbers	Recording date	Title	Composer	Other artists	Disc catalogue numbers	Size	External link to a transfer	Remarks
51177	31 July 1923	Nina (Tri giorni)	L. Vincenzo Ciampi, incorrectly attributed to Pergolese arr. for cello and piano	Arnold Földesy (cello)	Homocord B. 8510	12"	Nina on YouTube	Matrix dates: G31C A30125; note the same piece as matrix xxB 6679.
1432-A, 1522-A	ca. November 1923	Variations et Valse, Thème et Variations	Pyotr Ilyich Tschaikovsky	Kroyt-Trio	Vox 06149	12"		
1456-A	1923	Chants Polonais Moja pieszczotka "My darling" Op. 74, No. 12	Frédéric Chopin arr. Franz Liszt	(solo)	Vox 06179	12"	The Maiden's Wish on YouTube	Note the transfer is of a different Chopin's song from this opus. Either the discographies are wrong, this is an unidentified record, or it is misattributed to Szreter on YouTube.
1457-A	1923	Waltz No. 7 in C sharp minor, Op. 64, No. 2	Frédéric Chopin	(solo)	Vox 06179	12"		
1483½-A	ca. November 1923 Released January 1924	Piano Trio No 1 in D minor, Op. 32 III. Elegia	Anton Arensky	Kroyt-Trio	Vox 06141	12"	Arensky Trio at archive.org	abridged
1484½-A	ca. November 1923 Released January 1924	Piano Trio No 1 in D minor, Op. 32 II. Scherzo	Anton Arensky	Kroyt-Trio	Vox 06141	12"	Arensky Trio at archive.org	abridged
1486-A	ca. November 1923 Released January 1924	Waltz No. 11 in G flat major, Op. 70, No. 1 Étude in F minor, Op. 25, No. 2 "Bees"	Frédéric Chopin	(solo)	Vox 06152	12"		Blüthner piano
1488-A	ca. November 1923 Released January 1924	Mazurka No. 23 in D major, Op. 33 No. 2 Waltz in E minor, Op. posth.	Frédéric Chopin	(solo)	Vox 06152	12"		Blüthner piano
1543-A	ca. December 1923	Liebling der Frauen - Konzert-Walzer	Georges Boulanger	Georges Boulanger (violin)	Vox 06167	12"		Probably Szreter at the piano.
1572½-A	ca. December 1923	Potpourri russischer Lieder	Georges Boulanger	Georges-Boulanger-Trio	Vox 06167	12"		Probably Szreter at the piano.
1569½-A	ca. December 1923	Vox-Boston	Georges Boulanger	Georges-Boulanger-Trio	Vox 06166	12"	Vox-Boston on YouTube	Probably Szreter at the piano.
1573½-A	ca. December 1923 Released April 1924	Romance Triste	Georges Boulanger	Georges-Boulanger-Trio	Vox 01555	12"		Probably Szreter at the piano.
1583-A	ca. December 1923 Released April 1924	Natascha (Russische Weise)	Hans May	Orchester Georges Boulanger	Vox 01530	12"		Probably Szreter at the piano.
1980-B	1923? Released January 1924	Valse Paraphrase, Op. 64, No. 6	Frédéric Chopin arr. Aleksander Michałowski	(solo)	Vox 6153	10"	Paraphrase on the Waltz in D Flat major, Op. 64 No. 1, 'Minute' on YouTube	Blüthner piano
1981-B	1923? Released January 1924	Lieder von Fr. Schubert, S558 IX. Ständchen von Shakespeare 'Horch, horch! die Lerch', D889	Franz Schubert arr. Franz Liszt	(solo)	Vox 6153	10"	12 Lieder von Franz Schubert, S. 558 - No. 9 Ständchen Von Shakespeare 'Hark, hark, the lark!' on YouTube	Blüthner piano

=== 1924 ===
Matrix numbers	Recording date	Title	Composer	Other artists	Disc catalogue numbers	Size	External link to a transfer	Remarks
xxB 6683-3, xxB 6684-2	23 January 1924	Zigeunerweisen, Op. 20, No. 1	Pablo de Sarasate arr. Arnold Földesy	Arnold Földesy (cello)	Odeon (Germany) O-7293 (AA 55085 - AA 55086) Odeon (Germany) DeLuxe XX 80173-XX 80174 Odeon (Germany) AA 55085 - AA 55086 Odeon (Germany) O-8523 (XX 80173 - XX 80174)	12"		
xxB 6906	23 January 1924	Zur Guitarre	David Popper	Arnold Földesy (cello)	Odeon (Germany) DeLuxe XX 80179 Odeon (Germany) AA 53315 Odeon (Germany) O-6480 (AA 53315)	12"	Zur Guitarre on YouTube	
xxB 6907	23 January 1924	Intermezzo	Edouard Lalo	Arnold Földesy (cello)	Odeon (Germany) DeLuxe XX 80189 Odeon (Germany) AA 53316 Odeon (Germany) O-6480 (AA 53316)	12"		
xxB 6908	23 January 1924	Chanson érotique	Dienzl Oszkár	Arnold Földesy (cello)	Odeon (Germany) O-6479 (AA 53313) Odeon (Germany) DeLuxe XX 80156 Odeon (Germany) AA 53313	12"		
xxB 6909	23 January 1924	Scherzo fantastique	Polonyi Elemér	Arnold Földesy (cello)	Odeon (Germany) O-6479 (AA 53314) Odeon (Germany) DeLuxe XX 80157 Odeon (Germany) AA 53314	12"		Note the same piece as matrix 51176-1.
xxB 6910	23 January 1924	Allegretto quasi Minuetto	Johannes Brahms	Arnold Földesy (cello)	Odeon (Germany) DeLuxe XX 80175 Odeon (Germany) AA 53297 Odeon (Germany) O-6471 (AA 53297) Odeon (Germany) O-8062 (XX 80175)	12"		
xxB 6911	23 January 1924	Sonata for Cello	Pietro Antonio Locatelli	Arnold Földesy (cello)	Odeon (Germany) DeLuxe XX 80176 Odeon (Germany) AA 53298 Odeon (Germany) O-6471 (AA 53298) Odeon (Germany) O-8062 (XX 80176)	12"		
51176-1	25 January 1924	Scherzo fantastique	Polonyi Elemér (mis-spelled as Polononyi)	Arnold Földesy (cello)	Homocord B. 8510	12"	Scherzo Fantastique on YouTube	Matrix dates: A25B A25224; note the same piece as matrix xxB 6909.
51179-1	25 January 1924	Nocturne in E flat major, Op. 9 No. 2	Frédéric Chopin (arr. for cello and piano)	Arnold Földesy (cello)	Homocord 1-8505	12"		Matrix dates: A25B A41024
51180-1	25 January 1924	Serenade espagnole	David Popper	Arnold Földesy (cello)	Homocord 1-8505	12"		Matrix dates: A25B A41024
1621-A	ca. January 1924	Mein Walzer	Georges Boulanger	Georges-Boulanger-Trio	Vox 06166	12"		Probably Szreter at the piano.
1642-A	ca. February 1924	Scherzo, Op.12, No.2	Daniël van Goens	Gregor Piatigorsky (cello)	Vox 06170	12"		
1644-A	ca. February 1924	Adagio	Giovanni Battista Grazioli	Gregor Piatigorsky (cello)	Vox 06170	12"		
1641-A	ca. February 1924	Herbstlied, Op. 37a, No. 10	Pyotr Ilyich Tchaikovsky	Gregor Piatigorsky (cello)	Vox 06244	12"		
1643-A	ca. February 1924	Sonata in g Largo and corrente	Henry Eccles	Gregor Piatigorsky (cello)	Vox 06244	12"		
1645-A	ca. February 1924	Olivier (foxtrot)	Georges Boulanger	Georges-Boulanger-Trio	Vox 06182	12"		Probably Szreter at the piano.
1655-A	ca. February 1924	Olympiada - Foxtrot	Georges Boulanger	Georges-Boulanger-Trio	Vox 06182	12"		Probably Szreter at the piano.
1646-A	ca. February 1924	Zigeuner-Träume	Georges Boulanger	Georges-Boulanger-Trio	Vox 06174	12"	Zigeuner-Träume on YouTube	Probably Szreter at the piano.
1675-A	ca. February 1924	Herzen und Blumen	Alphons Czibulka arr. Theodore Moses Tobani	Georges-Boulanger-Trio	Vox 06174	12"	Herzen und Blumen on YouTube	Probably Szreter at the piano.
1661½-A	ca. February 1924	Concerto for Violin, Op. 8 II. Lento ma non troppo	Richard Strauss	Rudolf Deman (violin)	Vox 06183	12"		
1662-A	ca. February 1924	Menuett	Wolfgang Amadeus Mozart	Rudolf Deman (violin)	Vox 06183	12"		
1668-A	ca. February 1924	Atlantic (foxtrot)	Georges Boulanger	Georges-Boulanger-Trio	Vox 01554	12"		Probably Szreter at the piano.
1669-A	ca. February 1924	Oriental - Intermezzo	Georges Boulanger	Georges-Boulanger-Trio	Vox 01554	12"		Probably Szreter at the piano.
1676-A	ca. February 1924	Habe Mitlied mit mir...	Mischa Bakaleinikov	Georges-Boulanger-Trio	Vox 01555	12"		Probably Szreter at the piano.
2154-B	ca. March 1924	Grossmütterchen (Ländler), op. 20	Gustav Langer	Rudolf Deman (violin)	Vox 6181	10"		
2155-B	ca. March 1924	Grossväterchen, op. 22	Gustav Langer	Rudolf Deman (violin)	Vox 6181	10"		
?	ca. March 1924	Orientale, Op. 50, No. 9	César Cui	Rudolf Deman (violin)	Vox 06180	12"		
?	ca. March 1924	Canzonetta, Op. 6	Alfredo D'Ambrosio	Rudolf Deman (violin)	Vox 06180	12"		
xxB 6998	23 April 1924	Extase - Rêverie	Louis G. Ganne	Boris Kroyt (violin), Arnold Földesy (cello)	Odeon (Germany) AA 79536	12"		'Schwechten piano'
xxB 6999	23 April 1924	Le Carnaval des Animaux 13: Le cygne	Camille Saint-Saëns	Boris Kroyt (violin), Arnold Földesy (cello), Otto Müller (harp)	Unreleased	12"		(unclear if with Szreter)
xxB 7000	23 April 1924	Songs without words, Op. 62 6: Allegretto grazioso in A (Nr.30) "Frühlingslied"	Felix Mendelssohn	Boris Kroyt (violin), Arnold Földesy (cello)	Odeon (Germany) AA 79537 Odeon (Germany) O-6072 (AA 79537)	12"		'Schwechten piano'
xxB 7001	23 April 1924	Kinderszenen, Op. 15 7: Träumerei	Robert Schumann	Boris Kroyt (violin), Arnold Földesy (cello)	Odeon (Germany) AA 79538 Odeon (Germany) O-6072 (AA 79538)	12"		'Schwechten piano'
?	ca. September 1924	The Seasons, Op. 37a, No. 6 1: Barcarole	Pyotr Ilyich Tschaikovsky	Tino-Valeria-Trio	Vox 06221	12"		Probably Szreter at the piano.
552 az	ca. 1924-1925	Zapateado, Op. 23, No. 2	Pablo de Sarasate	Gregor Piatigorsky (cello)	Polyphon 50441 (Kat. Nr. 110048)	12"		
553 az	ca. 1924-1925	Jocelyn IV/10: Cachés dans cet asile - Berceuse	Benjamin Godard	Gregor Piatigorsky (cello)	Polyphon 50441 (Kat. Nr. 110049)	12"		
1718 ax	ca. 1924-1925	Der Schmetterling (The Butterfly)	David Popper	Gregor Piatigorsky (cello)	Nordisk Polyphon (Denmark) S 48006 (Order no. X.S. 48006) Polyphon 31483 Kat. Nr. 26464	??		
1719 ax	ca. 1924-1925	Serenade from Les Millions d'Arlequin	Riccardo Drigo	Gregor Piatigorsky (cello)	Nordisk Polyphon (Dernmark) S 48007 (Order no. X.S. 48007) Polyphon 31483 Kat. Nr. 26465	??		

=== 1925 ===
Matrix numbers	Recording date	Title	Composer	Other artists	Disc catalogue numbers	Size	External link to a transfer	Remarks
2163-A	ca. February 1925	Flirtation - Boston	Georges Boulanger	Georges-Boulanger-Trio	Vox 06246	12"		Probably Szreter at the piano.
2164-A	ca. February 1925	Chanson de l'adieu - Mélodie	F. Paolo Tosti	Georges-Boulanger-Trio	Vox 06246	12"		Probably Szreter at the piano.
2284-A	ca. April 1925	Les sirènes «Sirenenzauber» - Valse	Emile Waldteufel	Georges-Boulanger-Trio	Vox 06280	12"		Probably Szreter at the piano.
2292-A	ca. April 1925	Tripping Along - Waltz	Jerry Sullivan, Harry Hosford	Georges-Boulanger-Trio	Vox 06280	12"		Probably Szreter at the piano.
2509-B	1925	Trois fantaisies ou caprices, Op. 16 No. 2 Scherzo in E minor	Felix Mendelssohn	(solo)	Vox 6245	10"		Blüthner piano
2510-B	1925	Staccato Caprice	Max Vogrich	(solo)	Vox 6245	10"		Blüthner piano
2513½-B	1925 Released December 1925	Faust II/9: Ainsi que la brise légère - Valse final	Charles Gounod arr. Franz Liszt	(solo)	Vox 6270	10"		Blüthner piano; abridged
2514-B	1925 Released December 1925	La Source "Naïla" II/4: Divertissement - 1: Pas des voiles	Léo Delibes	(solo)	Vox 6270	10"		Blüthner piano
2548-A	1925? Released April 1926	Wasserfall (Cascade)	Ferenc Vecsey	Ferenc Vecsey (violin)	Vox 06294	12"		Blüthner piano
2550-A	1925? Released April 1926	Humoresky, Op. 101 Humoreska in G sharp major - Poco lento grazioso	Antonín Dvořák arr. August Wilhelmj	Ferenc Vecsey (violin)	Vox 06294	12"		Blüthner piano
2551-A	1925? Released May 1926	Ouverture 3 in D major 2: Air (Air on G-string)	Johann Sebastian Bach	Ferenc Vecsey (violin)	Vox 06295	12"		Blüthner piano
2552-A	1925? Released May 1926	Zigeunerweisen, Op. 20	Pablo de Sarasate	Ferenc Vecsey (violin)	Vox 06295	12"		Blüthner piano
1259av, 1260av	ca. April 1925-May 1925	Sonata in g Largo and Corrente	Henry Eccles	Gregor Piatigorsky (cello)	Polydor 66170 (B28006-B28007) Grammophon B28006-B28007 Odeon (Japan) U-20	?		
1261av	ca. April 1925-May 1925	Guitarre in G major, Op. 45 No. 2	Moritz Moszkowski	Gregor Piatigorsky (cello)	Polydor 66171 (B28008)	?		
1262av	ca. April 1925-May 1925	Romanze sans paroles, op. 23	Karl Davydov	Gregor Piatigorsky (cello)	Polydor 66171 (B28009)	?		
1263av, 1264av, 1265av, 1266av	ca. April 1925-May 1925	Variations on a Rococo Theme, Op. 33 (abridged)	Piotr Ilyich Tchaikovsky	Gregor Piatigorsky (cello)	Polydor DD 66168 - DD 66169 (B28002, B28003, B28004, B28005) Schallplatte Grammophon 66168, 66169 Polydor (Japan) 40016, 40017	2x??		
2699-B	ca. May 1925 Released August 1925	Abendlied, Op. 85	Robert Schumann	Gregor Piatigorsky (cello)	Vox 6259	10"		
2700-B	ca. May 1925 Released August 1925	Serse (Xerxes) HWV 40 I/2: Ombra mai fu — Arioso (Largo)	Georg Friedrich Haendel	Gregor Piatigorsky (cello)	Vox 6259	10"	Largo on YouTube	
?, ?	ca. May 1925 Released September 1925	Kol Nidre - Adagio nach hebräischen Melodien, Op. 47	Max Bruch	Arnold Földesy (cello)	Vox 06263	12"		Blüthner piano
2347-A	ca. May 1925 Released October 1925	Thaïs II/2a: Méditation	Jules Massenet	Arnold Földesy (cello)	Vox 06267	12"		Blüthner piano
2348-A	ca. May 1925 Released October 1925	Drei Charakterstücke, op.64 (Zyklus) Wie einst in schönen Tagen	David Popper	Arnold Földesy (cello)	Vox 06267	12"		Blüthner piano
2349-A	ca. May 1925	Les Millions d'Arlequin Notturno d'amore - Sérénade (Boston)	Riccardo Drigo	Arnold Földesy (cello)	Vox 06272	12"		Blüthner piano
2350-A	ca. May 1925	Scherzo fantastique	Polonyi Elemér	Arnold Földesy (cello)	Vox 06272	12"		Blüthner piano
2776-B	ca. August 1925 Released January 1926	21 Ungarische Tänze WoO.1 7: Allegretto "Volkslied"	Johannes Brahms arr. Joseph Joachim	Andreas Weißgerber (violin)	Vox 6277	10"		Förster piano
2777-B	ca. August 1925 Released January 1926	Waldszenen, Op. 82 7: Der Vogel als Prophet	Robert Schumann arr. Issaye Barmas	Andreas Weißgerber (violin)	Vox 6277	10"		Förster piano
2396-A, 2397-½A, 2398-A, 2399-A	ca. August 1925 Released February 1926	Violin Sonata in G minor, Op. 7 No. 5 "Devill's Trill"	Giuseppe Tartini, arr. Fritz Kreisler	Max Rostal (violin)	Vox 06284, 06285	2x12"		Blüthner piano
2422-A	ca. September 1925 Released June 1926	Alt-Wiener Tanzweisen 3: Schön Rosmarin	Fritz Kreisler	Max Rostal (violin)	Vox 06281	12"		
2423-½A	ca. September 1925 Released June 1926	La Ronde Des Lutins - Scherzo fantastique, Op. 25	Antonio Bazzini	Max Rostal (violin)	Vox 06281	12"		
3007-B	ca. December 1925 Released May 1926	Valse Triste	Franz von Vecsey	Franz von Vecsey	Vox 6292	10"		Blüthner piano
3008-B	ca. December 1925 Released May 1926	A toi - Molto sostenuto	Franz von Vecsey	Franz von Vecsey	Vox 6292	10"		Blüthner piano

=== 1926 ===
Matrix numbers	Recording date	Title	Composer	Other artists	Disc catalogue numbers	Size	External link to a transfer	Remarks
3158-B	ca. February 1926 Released June 1926	Silver Threads Among the Gold - Song	Hart Pease Danks	Max Rostal (violin)	Vox 6296	10"		
3159-B	ca. February 1926 Released June 1926	Paraphrase über Paderewskis Menuett op. 14 Nr. 1	Ignacy Jan Paderewski arr. Fritz Kreisler	Max Rostal (violin)	Vox 6296	10"		
?	Released June 1926	Rondo brillante in E flat major, Op. 62	Carl Maria von Weber	(solo)	Vox 06299	12"		
?	Released June 1926	Rondo favori in E flat major, Op. 11	Johann Hummel	(solo)	Vox 06299	12"		
?	Released October 1926	Das alte Schloss	Modest Mussorgsky arr. Max Rostal	Max Rostal (violin)	Vox 06308	12"		Probably Szreter at the piano
?	Released October 1926	Rondo	Wolfgang Amadeus Mozart arr. Max Rostal	Max Rostal (violin)	Vox 06308	12"		Probably Szreter at the piano

== Electric recordings ==
=== 1926 ===
Matrix numbers	Recording date	Title	Composer	Other artists	Disc catalogue numbers	Size	External link to a transfer
834-AA	15 September 1926	Rondo brillant, II. Teil, Op. 70	Franz Schubert	M. Rostock	? (test electric record)	12" (single-sided)	
943-AA, 944-2AA	ca. October 1926	Weihnachtsfantasie	Victor Kahl	Tino-Valeria-Trio	Vox 06316	12"	
2-8942 (2-8949-2*) (xxB 7599), 2-8943 (xxB 7600), 2-8944 (2-8944-2**) (xxB 7601), 2-8945 (xxB 7602), 2-8946 (xxB 7603), 2-20003 (xxB 7604), 2-20004 (xxB 7605), 2-20005 (xxB 7606)	4 November 1926, 6 December 1926	Piano Concerto No. 4 in G major, Op. 58	Ludwig van Beethoven; cadenza Anton Rubinstein	Staatsoper Berlin, dir. Frieder Weissmann	Parlophon (Germany) P 9059*, P 9060**, P 9061, P 9062 Parlophone (UK) E 10533, E 10534, E 10535, E 10536 Odeon (Austria) AA 68021*, AA 68022, AA 68023**, AA 68024, AA 68025, AA 68026, AA 68027, AA 68028 Odeon (Germany) O-6522*, O-6523**, O-6524, O-6525	4x12"	Beethoven Piano Concerto no. 4 on YouTube: Part 1 Part 2 Part 3 [ Part 3]
2-20001 (xxB 7697), 2-20002 (xxB 7698)	6 December 1926	Soirée de Vienne, Op. 56	Johann Strauss arr. Alfred Grünfeld	(solo)	Parlophon (Germany) P 9044 Parlophone (UK) E 10561 Parlophone (Australia) A 4013 Odeon (Germany) O-6519 Odeon (US) 3208 Odeon (Austria) AA 68019, AA 68020	12"	Soirée de Vienne on YouTube

=== 1927 ===
Matrix numbers	Recording date	Title	Composer	Other artists	Disc catalogue numbers	Size	External link to a transfer	Remarks
BW 683	20 January 1927	Orphée et Eurydice. Act II Mélodie (Dance of the blessed spirits)	Christoph Willibald Gluck arr. Fritz Kreisler	Josef Wolfsthal (violin)	Electrola E.G. 415	10"	Gluck-Kreisler-Melodie on YouTube	
BW 684	20 January 1927	Playera Op. 23, No. 1	Pablo de Sarasate	Josef Wolfsthal (violin)	Electrola E.G. 415	10"	Spanish dance on YouTube	
BW 685, BW 686-2	20 January 1927	Z domoviny (Aus der Heimat). Andantino in G minor	Bedřich Smetana arr. Sitt	Josef Wolfsthal (violin)	Electrola E.G. 416 HMV AM1273	10"		
xxB 7592	31 January 1927	3 Nocturnes op. 9 Nocturne 2 in E♭	Frédéric Chopin	Max Oróbio de Castro (cello)	Parlophone (UK) E 10581	12"	Nocturne in E flat on YouTube	
xxB 7593	31 January 1927	At the fountain, op. 20 no. 2	Carl Davidoff	Max Oróbio de Castro (cello)	Parlophone (UK) E 10581	12"	At the fountain on YouTube	
1542-AA	ca. February 1927	Sadko Chant Hindou	Nikolay Rimsky-Korsakov	Georges Boulanger (violin)	Vox 06349	12"		Probably Szreter at the piano.
1543-AA	ca. February 1927	Elegie	Mikhail Glinka	Georges-Boulanger-Trio	Vox 06349 Kristall ??	12"		
xxB 7597, xxB 7598	4 February 1927	Soirée de Vienne, Op. 56	Johann Strauss arr. Alfred Grünfeld	(solo)	Odeon O-6519	12"		Also recorded on 6 December 1926.
xxB 7633	2 March 1927	Jocelyn IV/10: Cachés dans cet asile - Berceuse	Benjamin Godard	Dajos-Béla-Trio	Odeon (Germany) AA 212047 Odeon (Austria) AA 68036 b Parlophone (UK) E 10593	12"		
xxB 7634	2 March 1927	La serenata - Leggenda valacca	Gaetano Braga	Dajos-Béla-Trio	Odeon (Germany) AA 212047 Odeon (Austria) AA 68037 Parlophone (UK) E 10593	12"		
xxB 7635	2 March 1927	Extase - Rêverie	Louis G. Ganne	Dajos-Béla-Trio	Odeon (Germany) O-6612 Fonotipia XX 172171 (R 9290) Odeon (Austria) AA 68034 Parlophone (UK) E 10618 Odeon (Japan) U 10014	12"	Extase - Rêverie on YouTube	Note, that 3 takes exist: xxB 7635, xxB 7635-2, xxB 7635-3
xxB 7636	2 March 1927	Ideale - Romanza	F. Paolo Tosti	Dajos-Béla-Trio	Odeon AA 212020 Odeon (Austria) AA 68035 Columbia (US) 50201-D	12"	Ideale on YouTube	See also xxB 7636-2
xxB 7635-2	8 March 1927	Extase - Rêverie	Louis G. Ganne	Dajos-Béla-Trio	Odeon AA 212004 Odeon (France) 170.102	12"		Note, that 3 takes exist: xxB 7635, xxB 7635-2, xxB 7635-3
xxB 7641	8 March 1927	2 Melodies 1: Melodie in F	Anton G. Rubinstein	Dajos-Béla-Trio	Odeon (Austria) AA 68034 Odeon (France) 170.076	12"		
xxB 7642	8 March 1927	Chant d'automne, op. 37 no. 10	Pyotr Ilyich Tchaikovsky	Dajos-Béla-Trio	Fonotipia XX 172029 (R 9202) Odeon AA 212003 Odeon (Austria) AA 68042 Parlophone (UK) E 10573	12"		
xxB 7643	8 March 1927	Kinderszenen, op. 15 7: Träumerei	Robert Schumann	Dajos-Béla-Trio	Odeon AA 212003 Odeon (Austria) AA 68034 Odeon (France) 170.076 Parlophone (UK) E 10573	12"		
xxB 7644	8 March 1927	Simple aveu - Romance sans paroles, op. 25	Francis Thomé arr. Dajos Béla	Dajos-Béla-Trio	Fonotipia XX 172029 (R 9202) Odeon AA 212025 Odeon (Austria) AA 68041 Odeon (Germany) O-6625 Parlophone (UK) E 10580	12"		
xxB 7645	8 March 1927	Thaïs I/2a: Méditation	Jules Massenet arr. Dajos Béla	Dajos-Béla-Trio	Odeon AA 212025 Parlophone E 10580	12"		
xxB 7646	8 March 1927	1. Menuett in G; 2. Menuett in F	Ludwig van Beethoven arr. Dajos Béla Joseph Haydn arr. Dajos Béla	Dajos-Béla-Trio	Odeon AA 212004 Parlophone E 10618	12"		
2-20245, 2-20246	29 April 1927	Frühlingsstimmen - Walzer, Op. 57	Johann Strauss arr. Alfred Grünfeld	(solo)	Unreleased	12"		Recorded again on 22 August 1927, see below.
2-20263, 2-20264, 2-20264-2	20 May 1927	Frühlingsstimmen - Walzer, Op. 57	Johann Strauss arr. Alfred Grünfeld	(solo)	Unreleased	12"		Recorded again on 22 August 1927, see below.
2-20265 (xxB 7933), 2-20266 (xxB 7934)	20 May 1927	Hungarian Rhapsodies, S244 No. 12 in C sharp minor	Franz Liszt	(solo)	Odeon (Germany) O-6626 Parlophone (UK) E 10627 Odeon (US) 3241 Decca (US) 25112	12"	Hungarian Rhapsody No. 12 in C sharp minor on YouTube	
Be 5817	ca. June 1927	Siciliano and Rigaudon	Fritz Kreisler in the style of Francœur	Marta Linz (violin)	Odeon (Japan) U-43	10"	Sciliano and Rigadoon Francoeur at archive.org	
Be 5818	ca. June 1927	Romanza Andaluza (Spanish Dance)	Pablo de Sarasate	Marta Linz (violin)	Odeon (Japan) U-43 Parlophone (UK) R-135 Parlophone (Australia) A 2579	10"	Romanza Andaluza at archive.org	
Be 5819-2	ca. June 1927	Caprice Viennois	Fritz Kreisler	Marta Linz (violin)	Odeon (Germany) O-2223	10"	Caprice Viennois on YouTube	
Be 5820-2	ca. June 1927	"Hejre Kati"	Jeno Hubay	Marta Linz (violin)	Odeon (Germany) O-2223 Parlophone (UK) R 135 Parlophone (Australia) A 2579	10"	Hejre Kati at archive.org	
Be 5827-2	10 June 1927	Guitarre op. 45, no. 2	Moritz Moszkowski	Gregor Piatigorsky (cello)	Odeon (Austria) A 45366 Odeon (Germany) O-2331 (A 45366) Odeon 193126 Columbia (Japan) J5348, E5482 Decca 20043	10"	Guitarre on YouTube	
Be 5828	10 June 1927	Flute Sonata in B minor, op. 1, no. 9. Andante 'Larghetto'	Georg Friedrich Haendel	Gregor Piatigorsky (cello)	Odeon O-2410 (?)	10"		Note also Be 5828-2 below.
Be 5829	10 June 1927	Symphony No. 1 Minuet	Giorgio Valensin arr. Jules Danbé	Gregor Piatigorsky (cello)	Odeon (Germany) O-2410 Odeon (Poland) O. 236596	10"		Note also Be 5829-2 below.
Be 5830	10 June 1927	Chanson villageoise, Op. 62, No. 2	David Popper	Gregor Piatigorsky (cello)	Odeon O-2224 Columbia (Argentina) 193180 Odeon (France) 165.164	10"	Chanson Villageoise on YouTube	
Be 5831	10 June 1927	Après un rêve, op. 7, no. 1	Gabriel Fauré	Gregor Piatigorsky (cello)	Odeon O-2224 Odeon (Argentina) 193180 Columbia (Japan) J5348	10"		
Be 5832	10 June 1927	Sadko I. Ne shest' amlasov - Song (Indian Merchant)	Nikolai Rimsky-Korsakov	Gregor Piatigorsky (cello)	Odeon (Austria) A 45365 Odeon (France) 165.164 Odeon (Germany) O-2331 (A 45365) Parlophone (UK) R 679 Decca (US) 20153	10"	Chant Hindou on YouTube	
Be 5931	August 1927	Peer Gynt Suite No. 1, Op. 46 III. Anitra's Dance	Edvard Grieg arr. for solo piano by composer	(solo)	Odeon (Germany) O-2412 Odeon (Spain) 182.138 Parlophone (UK) R 117 Odeon (Poland) O. 236603	10"	Anitra's Dance on YouTube	
Be 5932	August 1927	Lyric Pieces Book 5, Op. 54 III. March of the Dwarfs	Edvard Grieg	(solo)	Odeon (Germany) O-2412 Odeon (Spain) 182.138 Parlophone (UK) R 117 Odeon (Poland) O. 236603	10"	March of the Trolls on YouTube	
2-20263-2 (xxB 7784-2), 20264-3 (xxB 7785-3)	22 August 1927	Frühlingsstimmen - Walzer, Op. 57	Johann Strauss arr. Alfred Grünfeld	(solo)	Parlophon (Germany) P 9143 Odeon (Germany) O-6549 Odeon (Austria) AA 68045 Parlophone (Australia) A 4013 Parlophone (UK) E 10640	12"	Frühlingsstimmen, Op. 57 on YouTube	
Be 8457	3 September 1927?	Scherzo, Op.3, No. 2	Willem Feltzer	Gregor Piatigorsky (cello)	Odeon 11681 Parlophone R 1078 Odeon (Argentina) 193582 Odeon (Italy) O-10103 Odeon (France) O-167895 Columbia (Japan) J5489 Decca 20066	10"	Scherzo on YouTube Scherzo at archive.org	
Be 5998	12 September 1927	Dedication	Gdal Saleski	Gregor Piatigorsky (cello)	Odeon O-2454 Columbia (Japan) J5429	10"	Dedication on YouTube	
Be 5999	12 September 1927	None but the Lonely/Weary Heart, Op. 6, No. 6	Pyotr Ilyich Tchaikovsky	Gregor Piatigorsky (cello)	Odeon O-2454 Columbia (Japan) J5429 Parlophone (UK) R 679 Decca (US) 20153	10"	None but the Lonely Heart on YouTube	
Be 6100	12 September 1927	Gavotte	Jean-Baptiste Lully	Gregor Piatigorsky (cello)	Fonotipia A 168374 (O 10329) Parlophone (Australia) A 2628 Odeon (Germany) O-2411	10"		
Be 6101	12 September 1927	Le Carnaval des Animaux - Grande Fantaisie Zoologique 13: Le Cygne	Camille Saint-Saëns	Gregor Piatigorsky (cello)	Fonotipia A 168374 (O 10329) Parlophone (Australia) A 2628 Odeon (Germany) O-2411	10"	The Swan on YouTube	
Be 5828-2	13 September 1927	Flute Sonata in B minor, op. 1, no. 9. Andante 'Larghetto'	Georg Friedrich Haendel	Gregor Piatigorsky (cello)	Odeon (Germany) O-2410 Odeon 193126 Odeon (Poland) O. 236596	10"		Note also Be 5828 above.
Be 5829-2	13 September 1927	Symphony No. 1 Minuet	Giorgio Valensin arr. Jules Danbé	Gregor Piatigorsky (cello)	Odeon O-2410 (?)	10"		Note also Be 5829 above.
xxB 7773-2, xxB 7774, xxB 7775, xxB 7776	30 September 1927	Variations on a theme of Beethoven, Op. 35	Camille Saint-Saëns	Georg Bertram (Pianist)	Odeon (Germany) O-6555, O-6556 Odéon (France) 170.047, 170.048	2x12"		

=== 1928 ===
Matrix numbers	Recording date	Title	Composer	Other artists	Disc catalogue numbers	Size	External link to a transfer	Remarks
1107-m3	February 1928	Serenata	Moritz Moszkowski	Trio (Tri-Ergon-Trio?)	Tri-Ergon TE 5117	10"	Serenata on YouTube	Probably Szreter at the piano
1111-m1	February 1928	Ich liebe dich	Edvard Grieg	Trio (Tri-Ergon-Trio?)	Tri-Ergon TE 5117 Star C. 8179 DeBeGe 2036	10"		Probably Szreter at the piano
1113-m1	February 1928	Berceuse (Wiegenlied)	Emile Godard	Trio (Tri-Ergon-Trio?)	Tri-Ergon TE 5118 Star C. 8180 Colorit 3145	10"		Probably Szreter at the piano
1086	February 1928	Stille wie die Nacht	Carl Bohm	Trio (Tri-Ergon-Trio?)	Tri-Ergon TE 5118 Star C. 8179	10"		Probably Szreter at the piano
1110-m1	February 1928	Träumerei	Robert Schumann	Trio (Tri-Ergon-Trio?)	Tri-Ergon TE 5119 Star C. 8180	10"	Träumerei on YouTube	Probably Szreter at the piano
1112-m1	February 1928	Am Meer	Franz Schubert	Trio (Tri-Ergon-Trio?)	Tri-Ergon TE 5119	10"	Am Meer on YouTube	Probably Szreter at the piano
1108-m3	February 1928	Mattinata	Ruggiero Leoncavallo	Tri-Ergon-Trio	Tri-Ergon TE 5120 Star S 5004	10"	Mattinata on YouTube	Probably Szreter at the piano
1109-m3	February 1928	Frühlingslied	Charles Gounod	Tri-Ergon-Trio	Tri-Ergon TE 5120	10"	Chant du Printemps on YouTube	Probably Szreter at the piano
xxB 7635-3	23 February 1928	Extase - Rêverie	Louis G. Ganne	Dajos-Béla-Trio	Odeon (Germany) O-6612 Odeon (France) 170.076	12"		Note, that 3 takes exist: xxB 7635, xxB 7635-2, xxB 7635-3
xxB 7636-2	23 February 1928	Ideale - Romanza	F. Paolo Tosti	Dajos-Béla-Trio	Odeon (Germany) O-6612 Fonotipia XX 120053 (E 5063) Odeon (France) 170.102	12"		See also xxB 7636
xxB 7641-2	23 February 1928	2 Melodies 1: Melodie in F	Anton G. Rubinstein	Dajos-Béla-Trio	Odeon (Germany) O-6774	12"		
xxB 7642-2	23 February 1928	Chant d'automne, op. 37 no. 10	Pyotr Ilyich Tchaikovsky	Dajos-Béla-Trio	Unreleased	12"		Released previous recording dated 8 March 1927, see above.
xxB 7643-2	23 February 1928	Kinderszenen, op. 15 7: Träumerei	Robert Schumann	Dajos-Béla-Trio	Odeon (Germany) O-6774	12"		
xxB 7633-2	28 February 1928	Jocelyn IV/10: Cachés dans cet asile - Berceuse	Benjamin Godard	Dajos-Béla-Trio	Fonotipia XX 172171 (R 9290) Odeon (Germany) O-6611 Odeon U-10004	12"	Berceuse de Jocelyn on YouTube	
xxB 7634-2	28 February 1928	La serenata - Leggenda valacca	Gaetano Braga	Dajos-Béla-Trio	Fonotipia XX 120053 (E 5063) Odeon (Germany) O-6611 Odeon U-10004 Odeon (Argentina) 177571	12"	Angel's Serenade on YouTube	
xxB 7644-2	28 February 1928	Simple aveu - Romance sans paroles, op. 25	Francis Thomé arr. Dajos Béla	Dajos-Béla-Trio	Odeon (Germany) O-6625	12"		
xxB 7645-2	28 February 1928	Thaïs I/2a: Méditation	Jules Massenet arr. Dajos Béla	Dajos-Béla-Trio	Unreleased	12"		Released previous recording dated 8 March 1927, see above.
xxB 7646-2	28 February 1928	1. Menuett in G; 2. Menuett in F	Ludwig van Beethoven arr. Dajos Béla Joseph Haydn arr. Dajos Béla	Dajos-Béla-Trio	Odeon (Germany) O-6608	12"		Previous recording of the same piece on 8 March 1927, see above.
xxB 8086-2, xxB 8087-1	12 May 1928	Wiener Blut, op. 354	Johann Strauss arr. Karol Szreter	(solo)	Parlophone (UK) E 10780	12"	Wiener Blut on YouTube Vienna Blood Waltz at archive.org: Part 1 Part 2	Also recorded in 1929.
xxB 8116-1	12 June 1928	Künstlerleben - Walzer, op. 316	Johann Strauss arr. Karol Szreter	(solo)	Odeon (Germany) O-6659 Parlophone (UK) E 10769 Columbia (US) G50207-D Columbia (US) G5114-M	12"	Künstlerleben on YouTube	
xxB 8117-2	12 June 1928	Fledermaus waltzes	Johann Strauss arr. Karol Szreter	(solo)	Odeon (Germany) O-6659 Parlophone (UK) E 10769 Columbia (US) G50207-D Columbia (US) G5114-M	12"	Die Fledermaus Waltzes on YouTube	
36148	22 August 1928	Norwegian Dances, Op 35 II. A minor	Edvard Grieg arr. Karol Szreter	(solo)	Parlophon (Germany) B. 12666 Parlophone (France) 28.069	10"	4 Norwegian Dances, Op. 35 - No. 2 in A major on YouTube	
36149	22 August 1928	Trois fantaisies ou caprices, Op. 16 No. 2 Scherzo in E minor	Felix Mendelssohn	(solo)	Parlophon (Germany) B. 12666 Parlophone (France) 28.069 Brunswick (Germany) 12666	10"	Scherzo in E minor on YouTube	
2-20880	22 August 1928	Liebesträume – 3 Notturnos für das Pianoforte III. O lieb, so lang du lieben kannst!	Franz Liszt	(solo)	Parlophon (Germany) P9338 Parlophone (UK) E 10885 Parlophone (France) 57020 Decca (US) 25130	12"	Liebestraum No. 3 on YouTube	
2-20881	22 August 1928	Boîte à musique (Spieluhr)	Emil von Sauer	(solo)	Parlophon (Germany) P9338 Parlophone (UK) E 10885 Parlophone (France) 57020 Decca (US) 25130	12"	Boîte à Musique on YouTube	
2-20882	22 August 1928	Rondo favori in E♭, op. 11	Johann Hummel		Unreleased	12"		Also recorded in 1926.
xxB 8197-1, xxB 8198-1	18 October 1928	Hungarian Rhapsody No. 2 in C sharp minor	Franz Liszt	Staatsoper Berlin dir. Frieder Weissmann	Odeon (Germany) O-6675 Parlophone (UK) E 10823 Fonotipia XX 172048 (R 9221) Odeon (France) 170.149	12"	Hungarian Rhapsody No. 2 on YouTube Second Hungarian Rhapsody at archive.org: Part 1 Part 2	

=== 1929 ===
Matrix numbers	Recording date	Title	Composer	Other artists	Disc catalogue numbers	Size	External link to a transfer	Remarks
xxB 8086-3, 8087-3	15 January 1929	Wiener Blut	Johann Strauss arr. Karol Szreter	(solo)	Odeon (Germany) O-6825 Odeon (Argentina) 177588	12"		Also recorded in 1928.
xxB 8277, xxB 8278	15 January 1929	Traviata-Paraphrase	Giuseppe Verdi arr. Karol Szreter		Unreleased?	12"		
2412	February 1929	An den Frühling	Charles Gounod	Tri-Ergon-Trio	Tri-Ergon T.E. 5557 Colorit 3182	10"		
2416-m2	February 1929	Peer Gynt Solveigs Lied	Edvard Grieg	Tri-Ergon-Trio	Tri-Ergon T.E. 5557 Tri-Ergon T.E. 5003 Colorit 3173 Colorit 3182 DeBeGe 2036 Star C. 8042	10"		
2414	February 1929	Frühlingsrauschen (Rustle of spring)	Christian Sinding	Tri-Ergon-Trio	Tri-Ergon T.E. 5558	10"		
2417	February 1929	Frühlingslied (Au printemps)	Charles Gounod	Tri-Ergon-Trio	Tri-Ergon T.E. 5558	10"		
2413-m3	February 1929	Sadko Chanson Indou (Hindulied)	Nikolay Rimsky-Korsakov	Tri-Ergon-Trio	Tri-Ergon T.E. 5559 Tri-Ergon T.E. 5004 Colorit 3160 Novaphon 4025 Star S 5004	10"		
2415	February 1929	Salut d'amour	Edward Egar	Tri-Ergon-Trio	Tri-Ergon T.E. 5559 Colorit 3160	10"		
Be 8118, Be 8119	April 1929	Hungarian Dances, WoO1 V. F sharp minor: Allegro VI. D flat major: Vivace	Johannes Brahms (arr. for piano and orchestra)	Berlin State Opera Orchestra dir. Frieder Weissmann	Parlophone (UK) R 408 Parlophone (Australia) A 2885	10"	Ungarische Tänze 5 und 6 on YouTube Hungarian Dance No. 5 at archive.org Hungarian Dance No. 6 at archive.org	
xxB 8317-4, xxB 8318-2	25 May 1929	Danse macabre, Op. 40	Camille Saint-Saëns (arr. for piano and orchestra)	Staatsoper Berlin dir. Frieder Weissmann	Odeon (Germany) O-6729 Parlophone (UK) E 10903 Decca (US) 25232 Fonotipia (Italy) XX 172124 (R 9272)	12"	Danse macabre on YouTube	
xxB 8387	3 September 1929	Prayer, from Jewish Life	Ernest Bloch	Gregor Piatigorsky (cello)	Parlophone (UK) E 11058 Decca 25139	12"	Prayer on YouTube	Uncertain: Karol Szreter at the organ.
xxB 8388	3 September 1929	12 Vierhändige Klavierstücke für Kleine und Grosse Kinder, op. 85: 12. Abendlied	Robert Schumann	Gregor Piatigorsky (cello)	Parlophone (UK) E 11058	12"	Evensong on YouTube	
xxB 8389, xxB 8390	3 September 1929	Kol nidre - Adagio nach hebräischen Melodien, op. 47	Max Bruch	Gregor Piatigorsky (cello), unidentified (organ)	Odeon (Germany) O-6731 Fonotipia (Italy) XX 172126 (R 9273) Parlophone (UK) E 10961	12"	Kol nidrei on YouTube	
xxB 8387-2	14 October 1929	Prayer, from Jewish Life	Ernest Bloch	Gregor Piatigorsky (cello)	Parlophon (Germany) 177625 Odeon (Argentina) 177625	12"		Uncertain: Karol Szreter at the organ.
Be 8456	14 October 1929	Song Without Words (No. 25 in G major)	Felix Mendelssohn arr. Fritz Kreisler	Gregor Piatigorsky (cello)	Parlophone (UK) R 1078 Odeon (Germany) O-11681 Odeon (Argentina) 193635 Odeon (Italy) 10103 Columbia (Japan) J5521 Decca (US) 20066 Parlophone (Australia) A 3344	10"	Song Without Words on archive.org	
Be 8701-2	30 October 1929	The Flying Dutchman Spinning Chorus	Richard Wagner (arr. for piano and orchestra)	Staatsoper Berlin dir. Frieder Weissmann	Odeon (Germany) U-35 Fonotipia (Italy) 168351 Odeon (Germany) O-11294	10"		
Be 8702	30 October 1929	Bal Costumé, Op. 103 VII. Toréador et Andalouse	Anton Rubinstein (arr. for piano and orchestra)	Staatsoper Berlin dir. Frieder Weissmann	Odeon (Germany) U-35 Fonotipia (Italy) 168351 Odeon (Germany) O-11294	10"		

=== 1930 ===
Matrix numbers	Recording date	Title	Composer	Other artists	Disc catalogue numbers	Size	External link to a transfer
2-21639	13 January 1930	Prelude	Sergey V. Rachmaninov	Staatsoper Berlin, dir. Walter Sieber	Unreleased?	12"	
2-21640	13 January 1930	Polnischer Nationaltanz, Op. 3, No. 1	Xaver Scharwenka	Staatsoper Berlin, dir. Walter Sieber	Unreleased?	12"	
xxB 8448 (re-numbering of Parlophon 2-21641)	13 January 1930	Lyric Pieces Book 08, Op. 65 VI. Wedding Day at Troldhaugen	Edvard Grieg	Staatskapelle Berlin, dir. Frieder Weissmann	Odeon O-6819	12"	Grieg Wedding Day At Troldhaugen and Norwegian Bridal Procession on YouTube
xxB 8449 (re-numbering of Parlophon 2-21644)	16 January 1930	Scenes of Country Life, Op. 19 II. Norwegian Bridal Procession	Edvard Grieg	Staatskapelle Berlin, dir. Frieder Weissmann	Odeon O-6819	12"	Grieg Wedding Day At Troldhaugen and Norwegian Bridal Procession on YouTube
Be 9019	3 June 1930	Ave Maria (Meditation)	Johann Sebastian Bach arr. Charles Gounod	Gregor Piatigorsky (cello)	Odeon (Germany) O-2990 Odeon (Argentina) 193582 Parlophone (UK) R 862 Decca 20010, 20019 Columbia (Japan) J5489	10"	Ave Maria on YouTube
Be 9020	3 June 1930	Kinderszenen, op. 15 7: Träumerei	Robert Schumann	Gregor Piatigorsky (cello)	Odeon (Germany) O-2990 Odeon (Argentina) 193582 Parlophone (UK) R 862 Decca 20019 Columbia (Japan) J5521	10"	Träumerei on YouTube
38610, 38611, 38612, 38613	20 August 1930	Piano Sonata No. 14 in C sharp minor "Moonlight", Op. 27, No. 2	Ludwig van Beethoven	(solo)	Parlophone (Germany) 49000, 49001 Parlophone (Australia) A3096, A3097 Decca (US) 20015, 20016 Parlophone (UK) R 771, R 772	2x10"	Moonlight Sonata, Op. 27 on YouTube: Part 1 Part 2 Part 3
Be 8251	May 1930 (May 1929?)	Suite Orientale I. Les Bayaderes	Francis Popy	Staatsoper Berlin, dir Frieder Weissmann	Odeon (Germany) O-11179 Parlophone (UK) R 678 Parlophone (Australia) A 3058	10"	Suite Orientale Part 1 on archive.org
Be 8700	October 1930 (October 1929?)	Suite Orientale II. Au bord du Ganges	Francis Popy	Staatsoper Berlin, dir Frieder Weissmann	Odeon (Germany) O-11179 Parlophone (UK) R 678 Parlophone (Australia) A 3058	10"	Suite Orientale Part 2 on archive.org

=== 1931 ===
Matrix numbers	Recording date	Title	Composer	Other artists	Disc catalogue numbers	Size	External link to a transfer	Remarks
2-21774, 21775, 21776, 21777	9 January 1931	Piano Sonata No. 8 in C minor 'Pathétique', Op. 13	Ludwig van Beethoven	(solo)	Parlophone (UK) E11095, E11096 Decca 25230, 25231 Parlophon (Austria) P 67000, P 67001 Odeon (Germany) O-7594, O-7595	2x12"	Karol Szreter plays Beethoven Sonata No. 8 on YouTube: Part 1 Part 2 Part 3	
2-21790, 2-21791, 133084, 133085, 133086, 133087	17 April 1931	Piano Sonata No. 15 in D major "Pastoral", Op. 28	Ludwig van Beethoven	(solo)	Parlophone E11189, R1116, R1117 Parlophon (Austria) P 67002, B-48008, B-48009 Odeon (Germany) O-7599, O-25719, O-25720	12"+2x10"	Karol Szreter plays Beethoven Sonata No. 15 on YouTube Part 1 Part 2 Part 3 Part 4	
2-21799, 2-21800, 2-21801, 2-21802-2, 2-21803, 2-21809	6 May 1931	Carnaval, Op. 9 (complete)	Robert Schumann	(solo)	Parlophon (Austria) P 67005, P 67006, P 67007	3x12"		Alternative takes of the recording below.
2-21799-3, 21800-2, 21801-2, 21802-3, 21803-2, 21809-2	15 October 1931	Carnaval, Op. 9 (complete)	Robert Schumann	(solo)	Parlophone E11180, E11181, E11182 Decca 25289, 25290, 25291 Odeon (Germany) O-7596, O-7597, O-7598	3x12"	Carnaval, Op. 9 on YouTube: Préambule Pierrot Arlequin Valse noble Eusebius Florestan Coquette Réplique Papillons ASCH–SCHA (Lettres dansantes) Chiarina Chopin Estrella Reconnaissance Pantalon et Colombine Valse allemande Paganini (Intermezzo) Aveu Promenade Pause Marche des Davidsbündler contre les Philistins	
133272 / 133272-2	21 October 1931	Sarabande	Arcangelo Corelli, arr. Fritz Kreisler	Szymon Goldberg (violin)	Unreleased ("verworfen")	10"		
133273	21 October 1931	Sicilienne et Rigaudon - im Stile von François Francœur	Fritz Kreisler	Szymon Goldberg (violin)	Unreleased ("verworfen")	10"		

=== 1932 ===
Matrix numbers	Recording date	Title	Composer	Other artists	Disc catalogue numbers	Size	External link to a transfer	Remarks
133569, 133570, 133571, 133572	16 June 1932	Servus Wien! - Großes Wiener Lieder-Potpourri List: Mei Muatterl is a Weanerin; Wie mein Ahn'l; Komm in die Gondel; Der Herrgott muß ein Wiener sein; Mein Lebenslauf; Im Prater blüh'n wieder; Ja, ja der Wein ist gut; Frühlingsluft; Ach, ich hab' sie ja nur; G'schichten aus dem Wienerwald; 's wird schöne Maderln geben; Gasparone; Zigeunerbaron; Frühling in Wien; Vogerl fliagst in d' Welt hinaus; Militärmarsch (Schubert); Fliegermarsch; Wien wird bei Nacht erst schön; Deutsche Tänze (Schubert); Geh mach dei Fensterl; Grüß euch Gott; Ich muß wieder einmal in Grinzing sein; Wien, du Stadt meiner Träume; Hoch- und Deutschmeistermarsch	Nico Dostal arr. Franz Stolzenwald	Edith Lorand-Orchester dir. Edith Lorand Guido Gialdini (whistling)	Parlophon B 48207, B 48208 Parlophone (UK) R 1292 Odeon O-25060, O-25061 Parlophone (Australia) A 3534, A 3535	2x12"	Good Day Vienna at archive.org: Part 1 Part 2 Part 3 Part 4	
133670, 133671	22 November 1932	Piano Trio No 2 in C major, Op. 87 II. Andante con moto	Johannes Brahms	Carpi-Trio	Odeon O-11791	12"	Andante con moto from Trio in C major, Op. 87 on YouTube	
133672 / 133672-2	22 November 1932	Lyriske Stykker 3: 5. Erotikk	Edvard Grieg arr. Fritz Henschke	Carpi-Trio	Unreleased? ("adoptiert" / "in Res.")	12"		
133673	22 November 1932	Hjertets Melodier: 3. Jeg elsker dig	Edvard Grieg arr. Fritz Henschke	Carpi-Trio	Unreleased? ("adoptiert")	12"		
133674, 133675	22 November 1932	Piano Quartet No 1 in G minor, Op. 25 IV. Rondo alla zingarese	Johannes Brahms	Guarneri Quartett	Odeon O-11748	12"	Rondo alla zingarese at archive.org: Part 1 Part 2	
Be 10110-6-0	24 November 1932	Odeon-Parade — Odeon-Künstler in Ausschnitten ihrer Aufnahmen (part 2) «excerpts from various Odeon recordings»			Odeon O-11756 b	10"	Odeon-Parade on YouTube	Includes excerpt from Träumerei, from Kinderszenen Op. 15, No. 7 by Robert Schumann, played by Karol Szreter and Gregor Piatigorsky.
133676, 133677	25 November 1932	Schubert-Paraphrase	Leopold Mittmann	Hans Bund (piano), Alfred Hecker (piano)	Odeon O-11777	12"		
133678 / 133678-2	25 November 1932	Liszt-Paraphrase	Leopold Mittmann	Hans Bund (piano), Alfred Hecker (piano)	Unreleased? ("in Res.")	12"		
133679	25 November 1932	Caprice	Nicolo Paganini arr. Franz Liszt	Hans Bund (piano), Alfred Hecker (piano)	Unreleased? ("adoptiert")	12"		
133687 / 133687-2	28 November 1932	Barcarole - June	Pyotr Ilyich Tchaikovsky arr. Fritz Henschke	Carpi-Trio	Decca (US) G-20365	12"		
133686 / 133686-2	28 November 1932	Chant d'automne, Op. 37, No. 10	Pyotr Ilyich Tchaikovsky arr. Fritz Henschke	Carpi-Trio	Decca (US) G-20365	12"		
133688	28 November 1932	Lieder ohne Worte 2, op. 30	Felix Mendelssohn	Carpi-Trio	Odeon O-11879 Parlophone (Australia) A 6227	12"	Venetian Gondola Song on YouTube	
133689, 133690	28 November 1932	Brahms-Fantasie	Fritz Henschke	Carpi-Trio	Odeon O-11806 Parlophone (Australia) A 6187	12"	Brahms Fantasy at archive.org: Part 1 Part 2	
133693	3 December 1932	Lieder ohne Worte 5, op. 62	Felix Mendelssohn	Carpi-Duo	Odeon O-11879 Parlophone (Australia) A 6227	12"	Autumn Song on YouTube	

=== 1933 ===
Matrix numbers	Recording date	Title	Composer	Other artists	Disc catalogue numbers	Size	External link to a transfer
Be 10238, Be 10239	17 February 1933	Venezia e Napoli - Supplement aux Années de Pèlerinage seconde volume, S162. III. Tarantella	Franz Liszt	Un-named orchestra dir. Otto Dobrindt	Odeon O-11832 Decca (US) G20031 Parlophone R 1607	10"	Tarantella from "Venezia e Napoli" on YouTube

== Other possible recordings ==
There are possibly more recordings which are not listed in the discography above, where Szreter performed anonymously:

1. As accompanying pianist, both in solo repertoire for other instruments as well as part of a larger group, as he was the 'in house' pianist at Vox.
2. There is a reference of Szreter performing lighter repertoire, as part of Tino Valeria-Trio, some of those records have been identified above. It cannot be excluded that more records exist, where other group or individual pseudonyms were used or where the performers were entirely anonymous.

On top of above, sequence numbers of piano rolls listed above seem to suggest that there might have been more of them.

== Membership in fixed groups ==
List of groups where Karol Szreter was a member:

1. Kroyt-Trio: Boris Kroyt (violin), Gregor Piatigorsky (cello), Karol Szreter (piano).
2. Tino Valeria-Trio: Tino Valeria was a pseudonym of Boris Kroyt and the trio included also Gregor Piatigorsky and Karol Szreter. This pseudonym was used for performance of lighter repertoire.
3. Tri-Ergon-Trio most probably: Max Rostal (violin), Gregor Piatigorsky (cello), Karol Szreter (piano). Also simply named Instrumental Trio.
4. Carpi-Trio: Daniel Karpilowsky (violin), Walter Lutz (cello), Karol Szreter (piano).
5. Carpi-Duo: Daniel Karpilowsky (violin), Karol Szreter (piano).
6. Guarneri-Quartet: Daniel Karpilowsky (violin), Boris Kroyt (viola), Walter Lutz (cello), Karol Szreter (piano). Szreter was a member of the until his death. Guarneri-Quartet should not be confused with Guarneri String Quartet.
7. Dajos-Béla-Trio: Dajos Béla (violin), Gregor Piatigorsky (cello), Karol Szreter (piano).
8. Georges-Boulanger-Trio: Georges Boulanger (violin), Gregor Piatigorsky (cello), Karol Szreter (piano). There was also Orchester Georges Boulanger, where Szreter might have accompanied.
