= Karol Szreter =

Polish classical pianist

Karol Szreter (29 September 1898 – 20 March 1933) was a Polish classical pianist.

== Life ==
Born in Łódź, Szreter began his musical career as a child prodigy; at the age of nine he made his first public appearance in his native Poland. At the age of 13, he received a scholarship to study at the Petersburg Conservatory, where he remained until the outbreak of the First World War. Szreter then continued his studies in Berlin with Egon Petri. After the end of the war he began to perform in Central and Eastern Europe. At the beginning of the 1920s he made his first recordings for the German label Vox; around 1925 he began his collaboration with the German branch of the Parlophone label; mostly popular numbers were created, mostly accompanied by a studio orchestra. In 1925 he appeared in a trio with the cellist Emanuel Feuermann and the violinist Boris Kroyt at the Sing-Akademie zu Berlin and at the Klindworth-Scharwenka-Konservatorium.

In 1926 Szreter recorded Beethoven's Piano Concerto No. 4, in 1930 three of Beethoven's piano sonatas and Schumann's piano cycle Carnaval. Under the common pseudonym Tri-Ergon-Trio (or only Instrumental Trio') he performed in a trio with the cellist Gregor Piatigorsky and the violinist Max Rostal for the Tri-Ergon Photo-Electro-Records label.

In 1930 Szreter appeared for the first time in Great Britain, where he had great success with audiences and critics. In 1933 Parlophone planned a series of recordings of the chamber music of Johannes Brahms, which, due to the death of the pianist, no longer came into being.

Szreter died in Berlin on 20 March 1933 at the age of 34 from leukaemia. The funeral took place on 23 March 1933 at Friedhof Heerstraße in today's Berlin-Westend district. The grave is not preserved.

== Recordings ==
=== With Gregor Piatigorsky ===
- David Popper: Der Schmetterling, for cello (1924)
- Daniel Van Goens: Scherzo for cello and piano, Op 12 (1924)
- Pablo de Sarasate: Zapateado, for violin and piano, Op. 23/2 (1924)
- Moritz Moszkowski: Guitarre, Op 45/2 for cello (1927)
- David Popper: Chanson Villageoise for cello and piano, Op 62/2
- Karl Davidov: Romance sans paroles, for cello and piano, Op. 23 (1925)
- Bloch/Schumann: Prayer - Evensong. Gregor Piatigorsky und Karol Szreter. Parlophone E11058
- Tschaikowski - None But the Lonely Heart aus Sechs Romanzen op. 6, 1869, (arr. Piatigorsky), Gregor Piatigorsky & Karol Szreter

=== Other recordings ===
- Johannes Brahms: Hungarian Dance No. 7 (arranged by Josef Joachim) (Vox 6277-A), with Andreas Weißgerber.
- Robert Schumann: Der Vogel als Prophet (Vox 6277-B) dto
- Chopin-Liszt: The Maiden's Wish (Życzenie), Op. posth. 74/1
- Beethoven: Piano Concerto No 4 in G major op. 58 (1/2), Orchestra conducted by Frieder Weissmann
- Johannes Brahms: Trio in C Major, Op. 87 (Odeon 11791)
- Johann Strauss II: Die Fledermaus
- Liszt: Hungarian Rhapsody No. 12 in C sharp minor
- Strauss: Soiree de Vienne (Parlophone E 10561)
- Liszt: Hungarian Rhapsody No. 2
- Camille Saint-Saëns: Danse Macabre. With the Grand Symphony Orchestra, Frieder Weissmann (Parlophone E 10903)
- Emil von Sauer: Boîte à Musique
- Schumann: Carnaval Opus 9
- Schubert-Paraphrase, l. and 2nd part. Szreter, Hans Bund and Alfred Hecker (Odeon 0-1 1777)

=== Discography ===
Complete discography is covered in a separate article Karol Szreter discography.
