= Alexander Fiedemann =

Russian-German violin virtuoso and music pedagogue

Alexander Fiedemann (1878–1940, Russian: Александр Петрович Фидельман) was a Russian-born German violin virtuoso and music pedagogue. His students included Mischa Elman, Toscha Seidel and Boris Kroyt.

== Biography ==
=== Early life ===
Alexander Fiedemann was born in Kyiv, Kiev Governorate, Russian Empire (today located in Ukraine) on 24 October 1878. His birth name was Ruvim Peysakhovich Fidelman (Russian: Рувим Пéйсахович Фидельман). His father, Peysakh Fidelman, was a Klezmer and gave Alexander his first lessons starting at age 6. At age 9, he began to study under Otakar Ševčík at the Kyiv Conservatory, and at 12 he went to Leipzig to study under Adolph Brodsky at the University of Music and Theatre Leipzig. Among his public performances as a student in Leipzig was an 1890 performance of a Charles Auguste de Bériot piece which earned him great acclaim in the music press.

=== Music career ===
When Brodsky was offered a position with the New York Symphony Orchestra, he brought Alexander along with him to the United States, where he played some concerts, including at Carnegie Hall in December 1891, and some with Arthur Nikisch and his wife Amelie Heussner in 1892. Upon his return to Europe, starting in 1897, he became the first violin instructor at the newly founded music school (Russian: Музыкальное училище) in Odessa (which would later become the Odessa Conservatory, now known as the Odessa National A. V. Nezhdanova Academy of Music). Among his students there were Mischa Elman, Naum Blinder, Alexander Schaichet, and Joseph Cherniavsky (who was his nephew). His brother Max Fiedemann was also a violin instructor in Odessa, known mostly for teaching Toscha Seidel for a time.

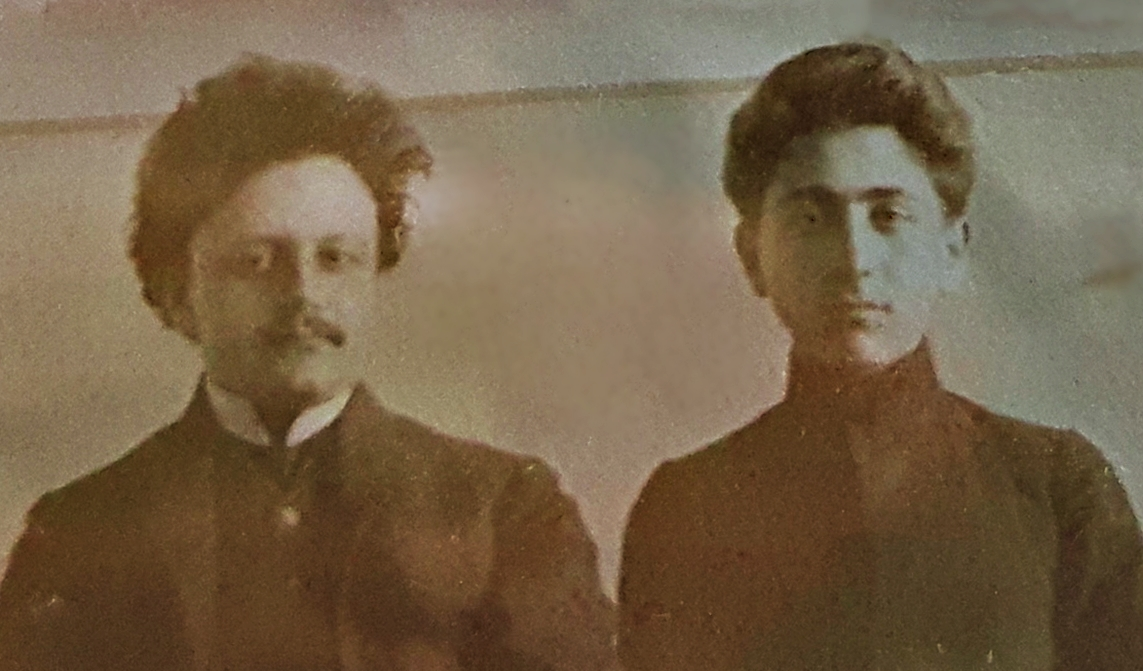
Alexander Fiedemann and Naoum Blinder

In 1907 he relocated to Berlin and soon started teaching at the Stern Conservatory, where he taught as the advanced violin instructor from 1908 to 1919. Among his students there were Boris Kroyt, Josef Roisman and Toscha Seidel. He also established a permanent chamber quartet there, the Fiedemann-Quartett or Fiedemann String Quartet, which became very well known. And he regularly gave concerts, such as one in 1909 with Gustav Hollaender conducting an orchestra, where he played pieces by Spohr, Mendelssohn, and Beethoven.

In December 1927 Fiedemann married Fanny Ruden. After the rise to power of the Nazi Party, they relocated to Prague. He lived his last years there in relative obscurity and died there on 28 January 1940.
