= Willy Schneider =

German singer (1905–1989)

Willy Schneider (5 September 1905 – 12 January 1989) was a German schlager singer who was born and died in Cologne.

== Songs ==
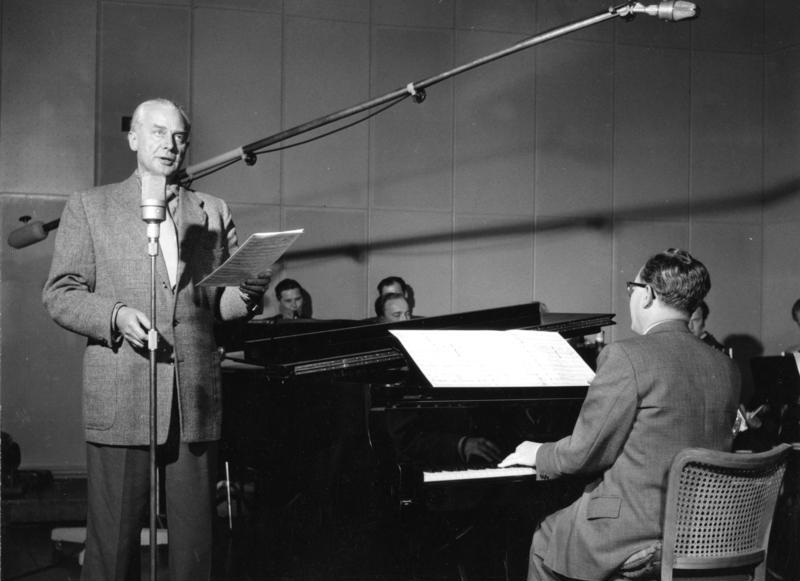
Willy Schneider (left) and Hans Bund with orchestra at WDR studio

- 1937: "Auf der Heide blüh'n die letzten Rosen"
- 1937: "Das kannst Du nicht ahnen"
- 1937: "Kornblumenblau"
- 1938: "Grün ist die Heide"
- 1938: "Blaue Donau, grüner Rhein" (on occasion of the Anschluss)
- 1939: "Gute Nacht, Mutter"
- 1940: "Herzliebchen mein unter'm Rebendach"
- 1942: "Heimat, deine Sterne"
- 1948: "Heimweh nach Virginia"
- 1949: "Heimweh nach Köln"
- 1949: "O Mosella"
- 1949: "Am Zuckerhut" (together with Danielle Marc and René Carol)
- 1950: "Wenn das Wasser im Rhein gold'ner Wein wär"
- 1950: "Kleine Kellnerin aus Heidelberg"
- 1952: "Schütt' die Sorgen in ein Gläschen Wein"
- 1953: "Man müsste nochmal zwanzig sein"
- 1956: "Bergisches Heimatlied"
- 1968: "Behüt' Dich Gott, es wär' so schön gewesen"
- 1973: "Alle Tage ist kein Sonntag"

== Awards ==
- Willi-Ostermann-Medaille
- 1973: Order of Merit of the Federal Republic of Germany, 1st class
- 1975: Deutscher Weinkulturpreis
- 1983: Hermann-Löns-Medaille
