= Naoum Blinder =

Russian-American violinist and teacher (1889 - 1965)

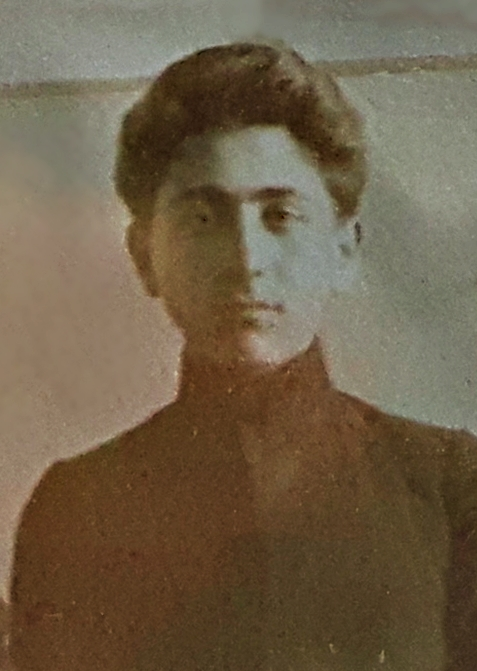
Naoum Blinder Portrait

Naoum Blinder (July 19, 1889 – November 21, 1965) was a Russian-American virtuoso violinist and teacher, born in Yevpatoria (then Russian Empire, now Ukraine).

== Early life and education ==
He graduated from the Imperial Musical College of Odessa at 16, where he studied with Alexander Fiedemann. From 1910 to 1913, he attended the Royal Manchester College of Music, where he studied with Adolph Brodsky. He then returned to Odessa to teach at the Imperial Conservatory of Odessa, which he did until 1920.

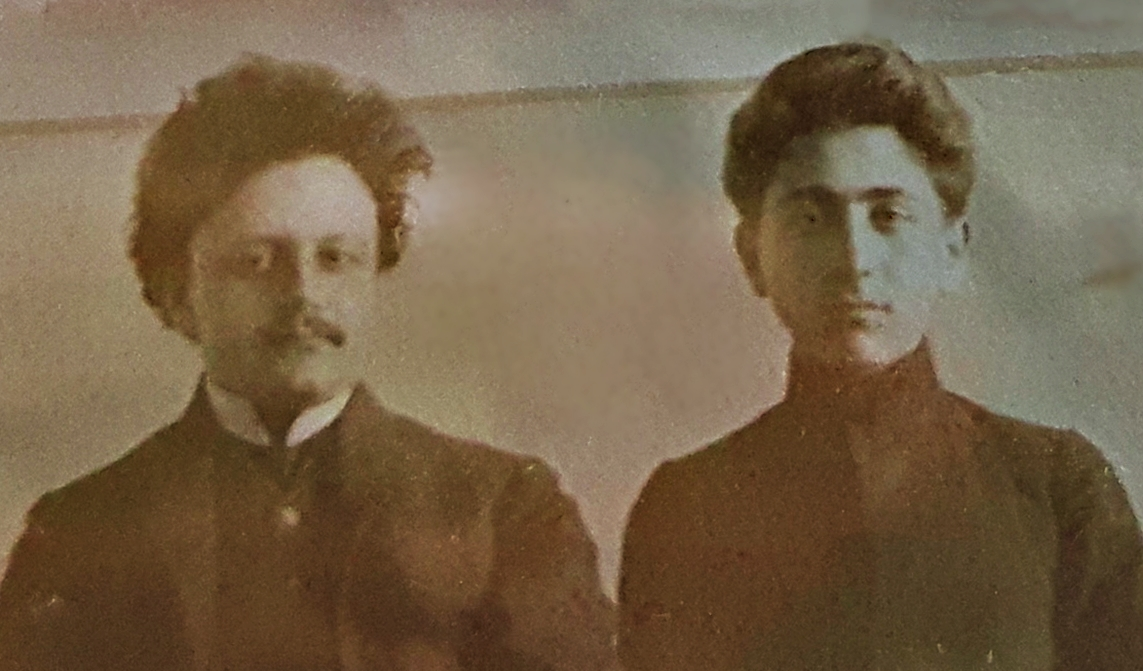
Alexander Fiedemann (left) and Naoum Blinder. The picture was taken when Blinder graduated in April 1906

== Violinist career ==
In 1921 Blinder embarked on a concert tour that included stops in Ukraine, Turkmenistan, Leningrad, Moscow among others. In 1926 he went on tour again, this time playing in Turkey, and Palestine and Siberia.

In 1928 Blinder played seven concerts in Tokyo and twenty three other concerts in other Japanese cities. Following this tour, he moved to the United States and began recording for Columbia Records in New York. From 1929 to 1931 Blinder and his wife and daughter remained in New York while he taught at the Juilliard School. Around this time, Blinder's teenage daughter died of tuberculosis.

In 1931, Issay Dobrowen offered Blinder the concertmaster position at the San Francisco Symphony Orchestra. He accepted and moved to San Francisco where he also played under Pierre Monteux and Enrique Jorda. He stayed with the orchestra until eyesight problems forced him to retire in 1957. Blinder also played as a soloist with many orchestras around the country. He co-founded the San Francisco String Quartet (1935), which included members of the orchestra, including his cellist brother, Boris.

== Teaching ==
Blinder was a noted violin teacher as well. His most prominent student was one of the most critically acclaimed violinists of the twentieth century, Isaac Stern. At one point, his students included 17 members of the San Francisco Symphony Orchestra, and the whole first violin section of the Oakland Symphony Orchestra. Other students of Blinder have had distinguished careers including David Abel, Austin Reller, and Glenn Dicterow, who was the concertmaster of the New York Philharmonic.

Blinder died in San Francisco on November 21, 1965, of heart failure, aged 76 years.

== Violins Used ==
- Giovanni Battista Guadagnini, violin 1753c ex-Rauer 1933
- Giovanni Battista Guadagnini, violin 1774 ex-Blinder
- Jean Baptiste Vuillaume, violin 1845-50 ex-Blinder
