= Edith Lorand =

Hungarian violinist, composer, and conductor (1898–1960)

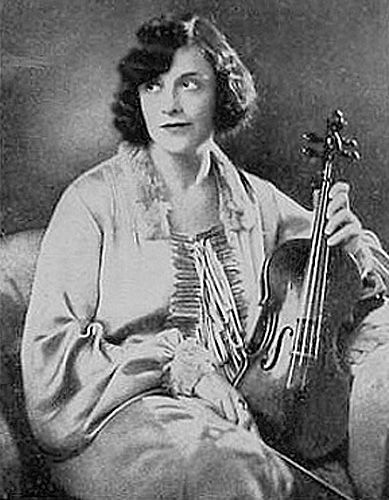
Edith Lorand

Edith Lorand (17 December 1898 – 23 November 1960), known as the "Queen of the Waltz" in France and as the "Female Johann Strauss" in England, was a Hungarian-American violin virtuoso, composer, and conductor. She made significant contributions in the field of music through her dual role as violinist and orchestra leader. She is known for creating many musical bands.

== Biography ==
Edith Lorand was born on 17 December 1898 in Budapest into a Hungarian-Jewish family. Her father was the director of an oil refinery and her mother was a pianist from Austria with Italian roots. She was fluent in French, Italian, and English. First she learned to play the piano from her mother, later she learned to play the violin from the famous Hungarian gypsies in her native Hungary. She graduated from the Royal Academy of Music in Budapest with Jenő Hubay and Carl Flesch.

When she was a child, she made her first public appearance at a charity concert. In 1920, she made her debut in Vienna. She performed both classical and popular music. She was more familiar with Viennese waltz, Hungarian and Slavic folk tunes. She also preferred the Viennese classics including that of Ludwig van Beethoven and Franz Schubert. During her soloist performance of violin, she played the compositions of Wolfgang Amadeus Mozart, Felix Mendelssohn and Jenő Hubay.

In the 1920s, she made Berlin as the center of her musical life. Since 1923 she was under a contract with the Lindstrom Group. In addition to her musical concerts, she became popularly known for her numerous recordings and radio broadcasts throughout Europe. She produced large number of recordings for German labels of the 1920s and 30s – Odeon, Parlophone, and Beka. In the beginning, she recorded numerous titles as a soloist, accompanied by Frieder Weissmann (1893–1984) or Michael Raucheisen (1889–1984) on the piano.

She is known for creating many musical bands. First she founded the musical group named Edith Lorand Orchestra. She later founded another popular musical band named Edith Lorand Trio (Edith Lorand, violin, Michael Raucheisen, piano, and Gregor Piatigorsky (1903–1976) and Hans Schrader, cello). Along with the trio, she formed the Edith Lorand Quartet (with Heinemann, second violin). She also performed with a 15-piece men's orchestra, which was formed together with the Lindstrom Group. Her Edith Lorand Orchestra toured throughout Europe.

In 1934 she left to Hungary as there was no prospect for an extension of her contract with Lindstrom Group, and her opportunities to perform in Berlin was increasingly restricted by the National Socialist cultural policy.

In Hungary she built up an All-Gipsy-Orchestra, which toured the United States in 1935 where one of her concerts took place in Carnegie Hall. In 1937 she finally immigrated to the US following the uncertain political situation in Hungary.

She married Egon Hood, an illustrator.

She died on 23 November 1960 in New York.
