= Toscha Seidel =

Russian violinist (1899 - 1962)

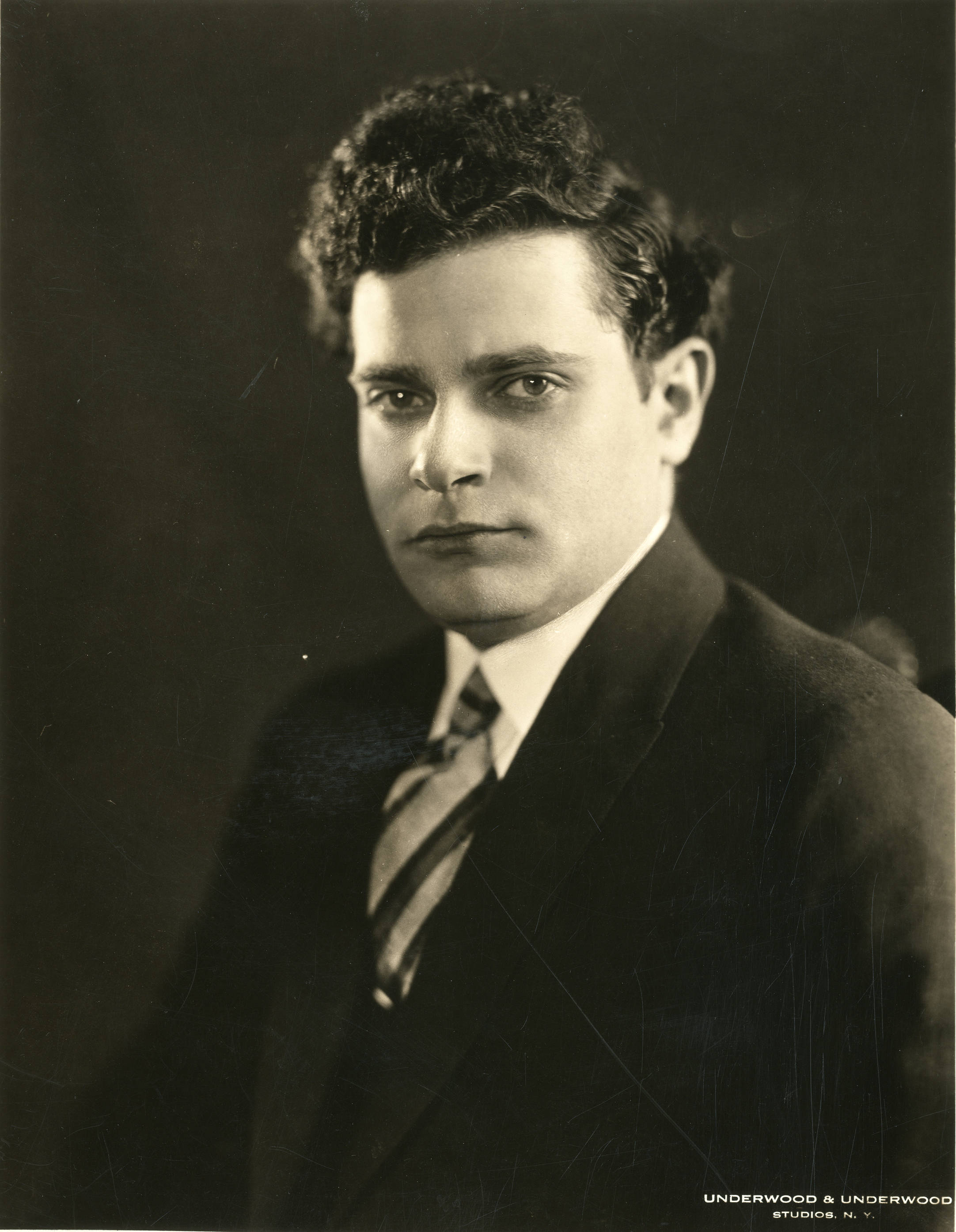
Toscha Seidel

Toscha Seidel (November 17, 1899 – November 15, 1962) was a Russian violinist.

== Biography ==
Seidel was born in Odessa on November 17, 1899, to a Jewish family. A student of Leopold Auer in St. Petersburg, Seidel became known for a lush, romantic tone and unique and free rubato. In the 1930s he emigrated to the United States. Before making his way to Hollywood where he made a career in the studios of motion pictures, he had a show on CBS radio called The Toscha Seidel Program; he was also that radio network's musical director. He was featured (as soloist) in several Hollywood productions, including the movies Intermezzo, Melody for Three, and even The Wizard of Oz. He was also an avid chess player (like Mischa Elman). In 1922, George Gershwin wrote a song about him and his fellow Russian-Jewish virtuoso violinists called, "Mischa, Jascha, Toscha, Sascha."

Seidel had a weekly broadcast on the CBS radio network in the 1930s.

In 1934 Seidel gave violin instruction to Albert Einstein, and received a sketch in return, reportedly diagramming length contraction of his theory of relativity.

He died on November 15, 1962.

== Instruments ==
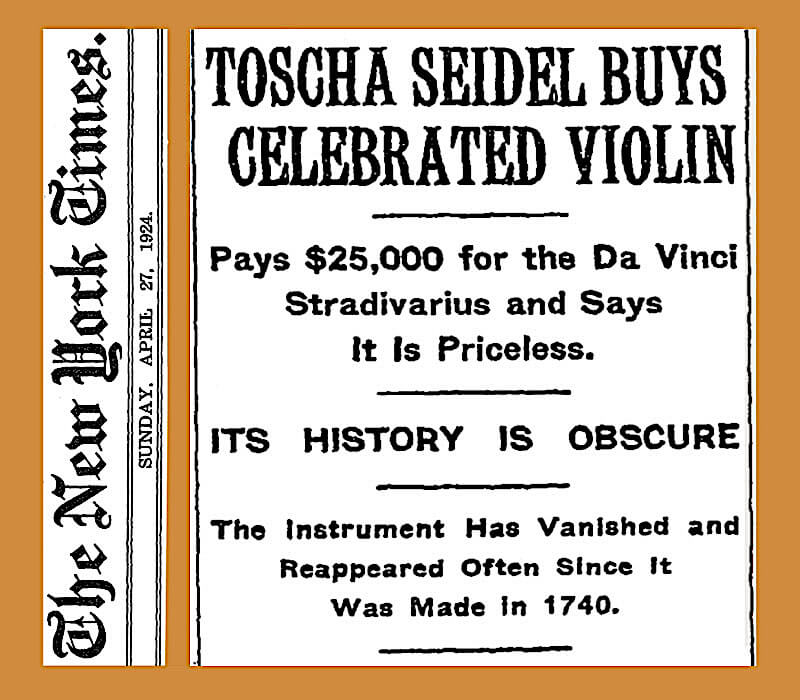
In 1924, Seidel bought the Da Vinci Stradivarius violin for $25,000 from a private dealer from Berlin.

Seidel performed on several well-known violins including:

- Antonio Stradivari, the "da Vinci" 1714 (now known as the Ex-Seidel), which he purchased in 1924 for $25,000 and said he wouldn't trade it for a million
- Giovanni Battista Guadagnini 1786 (now known as the Ex-Seidel)
- a copy of the "Alard Stradivari" by Jean-Baptiste Vuillaume 1860.

== Quotes ==
- "The boy (Jascha Heifetz) was one of those in a group of young Jewish violinists who later startled the world. The others would include Mischa Elman, Tosha Seidel, Efrem Zimbalist and Nathan Milstein." —New York Times by Harold Schonberg, Published: December 12, 1987
