= Georges Boulanger (violinist) =

Romanian musician (1893–1958)

- Born: George Pantazi; 18 April 1893; Tulcea, Romania
- Died: 3 June 1958 (aged 65); Olivos, Buenos Aires, Argentina
- Occupations: Composer, violinist
- Years active: c. 1910–58

George Pantazi (18 April 1893 – 3 June 1958), better known by his stage name Georges Boulanger, was a Romanian violinist, conductor and composer.

== Biography ==
Georges Boulanger was born in Tulcea, Romania to a musical Romani family. His father, Vasile Pantazi, was given the nickname "Boulanger" for his purported resemblance to the French general Georges Boulanger by a Romanian naval officer who saw him playing in a fiddle ensemble at Sulina; his son inherited the nickname and used it professionally throughout his career. Vasile "Boulanger" died while working as a performer in London in 1930.

The Pantazi family had a six-generation heritage of professional violinists, bassists and guitarists. Along with his father, George learned to play all these instruments. However, he had a special aptitude for the violin. At the age of 12, Georges Boulanger was given a scholarship to study at the Conservatory in Bucharest. Three years later, as he was playing Paganini, he was heard by the famous violinist and teacher Leopold Auer, who was fascinated by Boulanger's artistic skills. He was able to come to Dresden with Auer's support and there he studied with him for the next two years. Other students of Auer included Jascha Heifetz, Nathan Milstein, and Mischa Elman.

In 1910, when Boulanger was 17 years old, Leopold Auer considered his pupil's musical education complete. Auer gave him a violin as a going away present. Boulanger played on this violin throughout his life until his death. Under the recommendation of Auer, Georges Boulanger received a position of first violinist in the Café Chantant, an aristocratic institution in Saint Petersburg, Russia. Boulanger's "background music", a mixture of Romani music, Balkan tunes, and Viennese waltzes which could broadly be defined as salon music, proved popular with the Café's clientele.

While residing in Saint Petersburg, Boulanger met Ellionor Paulson, a student of law and medicine. They eventually got married and had two daughters, Nora and Georgette.

In 1917, after the Bolshevik revolution, Georges Boulanger left Russia and returned to Romania. There he worked in the armed forces for a few years. In 1922/23 he went to Berlin, where he was welcomed by the aristocratic White émigré scene. On December 4th, 1923, in Berlin-Wilmersdorf, he married Ellinor Paulson. At the time, he was 30 and she was 28.

In the year 1926, after his first radio recording as a soloist, his name suddenly became well known. Boulanger played in radio transmissions that were broadcast live throughout the country. He played in the most famous houses in Berlin and other large European cities such as the Savoy Hotel in London. He was signed by the Bote & Bock Edition who published his musical compositions.

The melody of his popular 1926 song Avant de mourir became a popular standard with the addition in 1939 of lyrics by Carlos Gomez Barrera and Jimmy Kennedy, retitled "My Prayer". In 1956 the recording of "My Prayer" by US R&B-pop act The Platters spent 23 weeks on Billboard's Hot 100, five of them at number one. Billboard ranked the single as the fourth biggest of the year.

Boulanger remained in Germany throughout the Nazi regime. On September 25, 1933, he requested proof of Christian, Aryan descent from the mayor of Tulcea in order to secure his employment in Germany after the passage of racial laws, which he was granted. By the end of the war, he was living in Mecklenburg, and was interned by the Red Army. He was freed from internment by American soldiers who learned that he was the composer of "My Prayer".

In 1948, he moved to South America. He worked in Brazil then settled in Argentina for the rest of his days. He died in Olivos, Buenos Aires on June 3, 1958.

== Compositions ==
Boulanger wrote about 250 compositions. Most of his works last 5 or 6 minutes.

- Afrika
- Auf der Hochzeitreise
- Autumn Moods
- Avant de mourir (later known as "My Prayer")
- Beside the Lake
- Budapest Party
- Buntes Allerlei
- Comme ci, comme ça
- Da Capo
- Danse Hongroise
- Der Dudelsackpfeifer (for solo violin)
- Der Lustige Schotte
- Die Glasharfe
- Die lustige Puppe (The Happy Doll)
- Die Zigeunerin
- Einsam steh ich unterm Sternenzelt
- Familien-Polka
- Flageolett Walzer No. 1 in G major (G.Boulanger)
- Flageolett Walzer No. 2 in G major
- Für Dich
- Gemuse! Gemuse! Gemuse!
- Georgette
- Zigeunerständchen (Gypsy serenade)
- Gruss an Franz Liszt
- Hallo! Budapest
- Heimweh (Homesickness)
- Herbstgedanken
- Hora – Rumänischer Tanz in A major
- Kinderparade
- Krach-Czárdás
- La Trioletta
- Liebling der Frauen – Walz
- Max und Moritz
- Mein Herz
- Norinka – Serenade
- Orientalische Nacht
- The Piper
- Pizzicato-Waltz in E major
- Puszta-Marchen
- Quand je suis content
- Ratata-Bum
- Schlaf Georgette
- Schmetterlingsspiel
- Serenade in E minor
- Tango Nora
- Tango Torero
- Teddy-Bear
- Tokay
- Vitamin-Polka
- Winke, winke
- Zufriedenheit (Träumerischer Walzer)

== As an actor ==
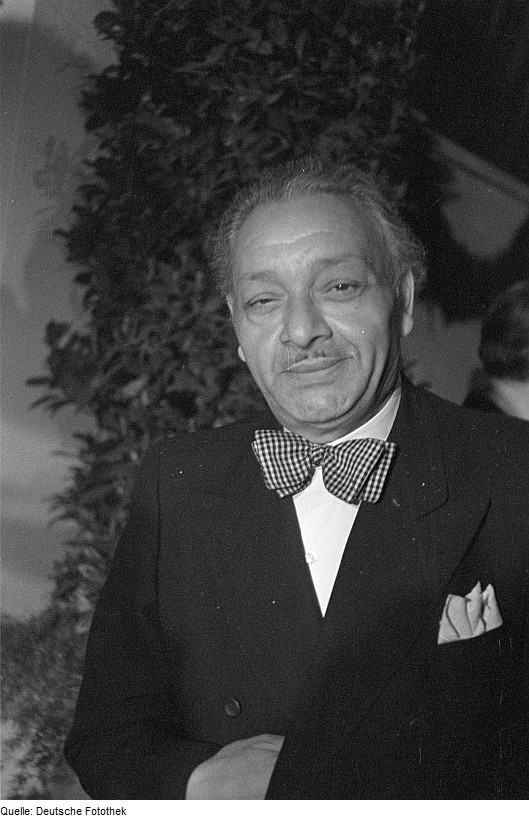
Georges Boulanger, 1946 in Potsdam-Babelsberg

Films Georges Boulanger appears in:

- Der ewige Klang (1943) ... with his ensemble
  - a.k.a. L'Éternelle Mélodie (France)
  - a.k.a. Der Geiger (The Violinist)
  - a.k.a. The Eternal Tone (UK)
- Immer nur ... Du (1941) ... Violinist
  - a.k.a. Man müsste Klavier spielen können (Germany) (One must be able to play the piano)
  - a.k.a. You Only You (International: English title)
- Die ganz großen Torheiten (1937) ... Violinist
- Das Mädchen Irene (1936) ... Violinist
  - a.k.a. The Girl Irene (USA)
- Punks kommt aus Amerika (1935) ... Violinist
  - a.k.a. Punks Arrives from America (USA)
- Die Geige lockt (1935)
- Allô Berlin ? Ici Paris ! (1932) ... President
  - a.k.a. Hallo hallo! Hier spricht Berlin! (Germany)
  - a.k.a. Here's Berlin (International: English title)
- The Mad Bomberg (1932) ... Well-known Violinist
  - a.k.a. Der tolle Bomberg
