= Boris Kroyt =

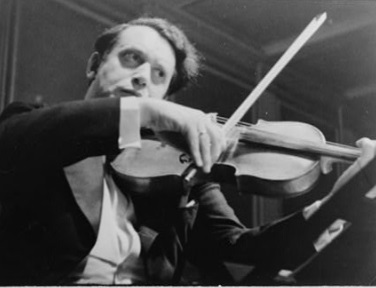
- Boris Kroyt c.1944
- Born: 3 June 1897; Odessa, Russia
- Died: 15 November 1969 (aged 72); New York City, U.S.
- Education: Stern Conservatory, Berlin
- Occupation(s): Classical violinist and violist
- Relatives: Anthony Brandt (grandson)

Boris Kroyt (3 June 1897 – 15 November 1969) was a classical violinist and violist. He was the violist of the Budapest String Quartet from 1936 until the ensemble disbanded in 1967. Kroyt was born to a Jewish-Ukrainian family in Odessa, but spent his early life and career in Germany where he had been a child prodigy violinist. From the outbreak of World War II until his death at the age of 72, he lived in the United States and had become a naturalized U.S. citizen in 1944.

== Early life ==
Bentzion Kroyt was born in Odessa to Osip (Iosif-Abram) Kroyt and his second wife Tzipa (Cecilia). His father, a tobacco merchant, had been born in Olyka. Kroyt had an older sister Bertha (born in 1893) and a younger brother Miron (Meyer-Itzhok, born in 1902). The family's apartment in the Jewish ghetto of Odessa was a meeting place for young radicals including Leon Trotsky and other members of the Bronstein family who were cousins of Kroyt's father. The Kroyts rented out one of their rooms to an art student who was also an amateur violinist. The four-year old Boris would listen to him and attempt to sing along with his playing. Taken with the child's music ability, he made him a violin out of cardboard. He later bought Kroyt his first real violin and persuaded a violinist friend of his to give the child proper lessons.

Kroyt's mother was initially opposed to her son becoming a musician, but on the advice of the violin virtuoso Alexander Fiedemann who had heard Boris playing a Haydn string trio with two other children, she eventually relented and enrolled him at the Imperial Music College of Odessa. His teacher there was Fiedemann's brother Max. Kroyt made his first concert appearance at the age of nine, accompanied by Max Fiedemann on the piano. At the age of ten, Kroyt's mother decided to send him to Berlin to study at the Stern Conservatory under Alexander Fiedemann who had offered to pay for his travel to Berlin and his living expenses. Before he left Odessa, Kroyt gave a concert to raise further funds for his study in Berlin. He raised 1400 rubles at the concert which had been attended by a thousand people.

Once Kroyt arrived in Berlin, Fiedemann persuaded the banker Franz von Mendelssohn (a relative of the composer Felix Mendelssohn) to provide Kroyt with a stipend and to finance the hiring of halls and orchestras for his soon-to-be concerts. Mendelssohn also gave Kroyt a violin made by Lorenzo Storioni. Kroyt returned to Odessa in 1910 for his Bar Mitzvah and to play at the Odessa Factory, Industry and Arts Exposition. It was the last time he would ever visit his native city. Kroyt lived in boarding houses in Berlin until 1912 when his mother and younger brother Miron (a student pianist) arrived in Berlin. His father and sister joined them in 1913. Later that year Kroyt graduated from the conservatory with the Gustave Hollander Gold Medal.

== Music career and marriage ==
After his graduation from the Stern Conservatory, Kroyt embarked on an international concert career as a violinist, playing in solo recitals and violin concertos, and with string quartets. He played as a violin soloist under the conductors Richard Strauss and Erich Kleiber and in chamber ensembles with the cellist Pablo Casals and the pianists Artur Schnabel, and Artur Rubenstein. He founded his own string quartet in 1921 and from 1927 also played with the original Guarneri Quartet for seven years as its violist. He had learned the viola as a teenager in three days when Alexander Fiedemann, who had his own string quartet at the time, insisted that Kroyt substitute for the quartet's violist who had taken ill. In 1924 Kroyt played in the first post-World War I performance of Schoenberg's Pierrot Lunaire in an ensemble that included Schnabel, the cellist Gregor Piatigorsky and the soprano Marie Gutheil-Schoder. A loud disturbance with boos and shrieking from anti-modernists broke out as the performance began. The music theorist Fritz-Fridolin Windisch jumped onto the stage to continue the protests and had to be forcibly removed. At that point Schnabel, Kroyt, and Piatigorsky began playing a circus polka. The audience burst out laughing, after which the performance went on without interruption to a successful reception. To supplement his meager earnings as a classical musician in the 1920s, Kroyt also played jazz in the Ruscho and Tariffa cafés in Berlin and led a small orchestra that performed and recorded tango music and operetta tunes. Unwilling to have his real name associated with the orchestra, he appeared with them as "Tino Valerio".

In 1932 Kroyt married Sophie (Sonya) Blumin. Born in Lithuania in 1908, she was the daughter of a wealthy Jewish architect. The family had settled in Moscow but fled Russia for Germany during the Bolshevik Revolution. She was a ballet dancer by training and had also studied law at the University of Berlin. Their daughter and only child, Yanna, was born the following year. Life was becoming increasingly difficult for Jewish musicians under Nazi Germany. In Germany itself, Kroyt could only play for Jewish organizations and he would need to concentrate on foreign engagements to support his family. In May 1936 he accepted an offer to play in an orchestra in Tel Aviv that was being formed by William Steinberg and Bronisław Huberman. However, later that month his old friend Josef Roisman (1900–1974), who was the First Violin for the Budapest String Quartet, asked him to replace their recently resigned violist István Ipolyi. Reluctant to move his young family to Palestine and an uncertain future and seeing the large number of international concerts for which the quartet were contracted, Kroyt accepted Roisman's offer. He played his first concert with the quartet on 31 August 1936 in Norway and would remain their violist until the ensemble disbanded in 1967.

The Budapest String Quartet were in the United States when World War II broke out in Europe. They accepted an offer from the Library of Congress to become resident there, playing on the Stradivarius string instruments in the library's collection in an annual series of 20 concerts at the Elizabeth Sprague Coolidge Auditorium. The Kroyt family settled in a house in Northwest Washington, D.C. where they became known for their soirées which were attended by prominent musicians and political figures. Kroyt and his wife and daughter became naturalized U.S. citizens in 1944 and lived in the United States for the rest of their lives.

Kroyt owned and played a Deconet viola. When the Budapest String Quartet took up residence at the Library of Congress, the library additionally loaned Stradivarius instruments to all its members.

== Later years ==
By 1964 the Budapest String Quartet's activities were starting to wind down. Kroyt increasingly appeared in solo viola recitals or with other ensembles. In 1964 he also joined the staff at Marlboro Music School and Festival where he coached the newly founded Guarneri Quartet. Their name was suggested by Kroyt who had played in an earlier quartet of the same name before he joined the Budapest Quartet. The young pianist Murray Perahia, whom he met there, became his protégé. Kroyt described him as his "musical godchild". Another Marlboro alumnus, the violinist Jaime Laredo, described Kroyt as one of the biggest musical influences in his life. Kroyt also coached student string quartets at the University at Buffalo where the Budapest Quartet had a residency. The quartet's last performances as an ensemble were three concerts in Buffalo in February 1967.

The music critic Michael Steinberg recalled meeting Kroyt in Buffalo the previous year:

It was an evening that ended with the Kroyts driving us to our hotel in an absolutely awesome vehicle, about the size of a motor launch, furnished in rich blues, frighteningly quiet, and representing a life style I had not associated with the playing of chamber music. I remember, too, a man of rare warmth, charm and humor, who spoke generously, perceptively, and with pleasing irreverence, about his colleagues in the musical world.

Kroyt was diagnosed with stomach cancer in 1968. Despite an operation, his condition worsened and he had to cancel a planned South American tour with Murray Perahia. His last public appearance was on 18 October 1969 when he played in a performance of Beethoven's String Quintet at the Alice Tully Hall. He died less than a month later at the French Hospital in New York City. The Guarneri Quartet played at his funeral, and a few days later at his recital in Pittsburgh, Perahia dedicated a Bach sarabande to Kroyt's memory .

After Kroyt's death, his widow Sophie continued the family's ties with the Marlboro Festival, serving as its social director until her death in 1980 at the age of 71.

== Family ==
Both of Kroyt's siblings also emigrated to the United States and became U.S. citizens. His older sister Bertha, the first to arrive in 1916, worked as a dressmaker in Chicago and died in 1947. His younger brother Miron was a piano teacher and concert pianist. He often performed with his wife Claire Sheftel, a violist. He died in New York in 1984. Kroyt's daughter Yanna was a television producer, primarily for CBS and WNET. Her television adaptation of The Nutcracker starring Mikhail Baryshnikov for CBS was nominated for an Emmy Award in 1978. Her husband Nathan Brandt is a history writer and the former managing editor of American Heritage. In 1993, he published Con Brio, a history of the Budapest String Quartet. He and Yanna also co-authored In the Shadow of the Civil War: Passmore Williamson and the Rescue of Jane Johnson published by University of South Carolina Press in 2007. Yanna Brandt died the following year in a car accident at the age of 74. Their son Anthony Brandt is a composer and Professor of Composition and Theory at Rice University's Shepherd School of Music.
