= Frieder Weissmann =

German composer and conductor

- Frieder Weissmann (photo with dedication)
- Occupation: conductor

Frieder Weissmann (23 January 1893 – 4 January 1984) was a German conductor and composer.

== Life and career ==
Weissmann was born in Langen, Hesse. His civil name was Samuel, which he kept - in the form Semy or Semmy - until 1916. After that, he preferred the first name Friedrich or Frieder in combination with Samuel, which was soon shortened to S. before disappearing altogether. In the 1920s, Peter was added as a third first name. Other surviving stage names are Ping-Pong and Marco Ibanez.

Weissmann grew up in Frankfurt, where his father Ignatz Isidor Weissmann (1863-1939) was Hazzan of the Hauptsynagoge from 1894 to 1937. After graduating from the Goethe Grammar School, he studied law at Heidelberg University for one semester in 1911, then philosophy, art history and music history at the Ludwig-Maximilians-Universität München until 1914. In Heidelberg, he received composition lessons from Philipp Wolfrum, in Munich from Walter Braunfels. At the outbreak of the First World War, he took the first step towards a conducting career and became répétiteur under Ludwig Rottenberg at the Frankfurt Opera (1914/16). In 1916/17, he was engaged as second Kapellmeister at the Stadttheater Stettin. From 1917 to 1921, he worked as a freelance concert kapellmeister and répétiteur in Berlin, Frankfurt and Munich. In all three cities he also appeared as a composer.

In 1920, he was awarded a doctorate from the Faculty of Philosophy at the Ludwig-Maximilians-Universität München with a dissertation on the composer Georg Abraham Schneider (1770-1839). This was followed in 1921 by an engagement as répétiteur and conductor at the Berlin State Opera, where he worked under Max von Schillings and Erich Kleiber until 1924. At the same time, Weissmann started a years-long close collaboration with the Berlin record company Carl Lindström AG, for whose Parlophon and Odeon brands he musically directed some 2,000 recordings until 1933. In 1924, he moved to the opera house of Münster as first Kapellmeister (1924/25), then in the same capacity to the opera house in Königsberg (1926/27). From 1926 to 1932, he was permanent guest conductor of the Dresden Philharmonic. From 1930 onwards, there was increased collaboration with radio orchestras in Stuttgart and Hamburg. In 1931, alongside Ernst Kunwald, he became conductor of the Berlin Symphony Orchestra, the former Blüthner Orchestra, which had merged with the Berlin Philharmonic in autumn 1932. With the Berlin Philharmonic he was only able to conduct four concerts and record one disc (Overture to Wagner's opera Rienzi) until January 1933.

In 1929, he married his long-time fiancée, the German soprano Meta Seinemeyer, who, seriously ill with leukaemia, died a few hours after the wedding ceremony. Weissmann had accompanied the singer on all her Parlophon recordings and numerous concerts in Dresden and Berlin.

As an artist of Jewish descent, Weissmann also saw his existence directly threatened by the Nazi Machtergreifung in 1933. He left Germany in June 1933 for the Netherlands, where he performed with the Royal Concertgebouw Amsterdam and the Algemene Vereniging Radio Omroep orchestra. This was followed by six-month stays - alternating with the Netherlands - in Argentina from 1934 to 1937, where he gave concerts in Buenos Aires Radio Splendid and at the Teatro Colón. It was also in Buenos Aires that Weissmann, who had acquired Argentinian citizenship in 1935, married his second wife Rosita Chevallier-Boutell in 1937.

After making his U.S. debut in late 1937 with the Cincinnati Symphony Orchestra, he moved his primary residence to New York in 1938, where he caused a stir in the summer of 1939 with a series of open-air concerts with the New York Philharmonic at the Lewisohn Stadium. He now recorded first with Columbia Records (among others Risë Stevens), and from 1945 with RCA Victor - an association that lasted until around 1950. From 1939 to 1947, Weissmann, who became an American citizen in 1944, conducted the New Jersey Symphony Orchestra and from 1942 to 1958, the Philharmonic Orchestra of Scranton, Pennsylvania. As successor to Artur Rodziński, he took over the direction of the Orquesta Filarmónica de La Habana in Havana, Cuba, from 1950 to 1953. In parallel to his permanent engagements, Weissmann was very active as a guest conductor in the US, Canada (Toronto, Montreal, Vancouver), Mexico and the Netherlands from 1945 onwards. After 1954, he concentrated on Europe and was celebrated there, especially in Italy, e.g. for a cycle of Mahler's symphonies, which he began as early as the late 1950s and concluded in March 1974 in Florence with a performance of Mahler's Second Symphony.

Weissmann was a central figure in the German recording industry between 1921 and 1933. He was Lindström's trusted house conductor. He usually conducted the orchestra of the Berlin State Opera, the Staatskapelle Berlin, or an ad hoc orchestra consisting of members of this orchestra. Weissmann not only collaborated on numerous vocal and operatic recordings with the leading vocal soloists of the 1920s such as Gitta Alpár, Vera Schwarz and Richard Tauber, but also conducted many recordings of purely orchestral music of both serious and light-hearted character. His repertoire was extremely broad and included operetta and light classical music as well as the major works of symphonic literature. Under his direction, numerous first recordings were made, e.g. the first complete recording of all Beethoven's symphonies in 1924/25. Outstanding are his electric recordings of Respighi's Fountains of Rome and Tchaikovsky's 1812 Overture. He accompanied the cellist Emanuel Feuermann on Max Bruch's Kol Nidrei and the pianists Moriz Rosenthal and Karol Szreter on their recordings of Chopin's Piano Concerto No. 1 and Beethoven's Piano Concerto No. 4. Weissmann's American recordings include opera recordings with numerous stars of the Metropolitan Opera such as sopranos Zinka Milanov, Licia Albanese, Helen Traubel, tenor Jan Peerce and baritone Leonard Warren, as well as a concerto for viola by Henri Casadesus, which had originally been attributed to Handel, with William Primrose and what was probably the first recording of Max Bruch's Scottish Fantasy, Op. 46 with violinist Jascha Heifetz as soloist.

Weissmann died on 4 January 1984 in Amsterdam at the age of 90 and was buried two days later at Zorgvlied Cemetery alongside Dutch painter Carel Willink, the husband of Weissmann's friend Sylvia Willink, who had died a few months earlier.

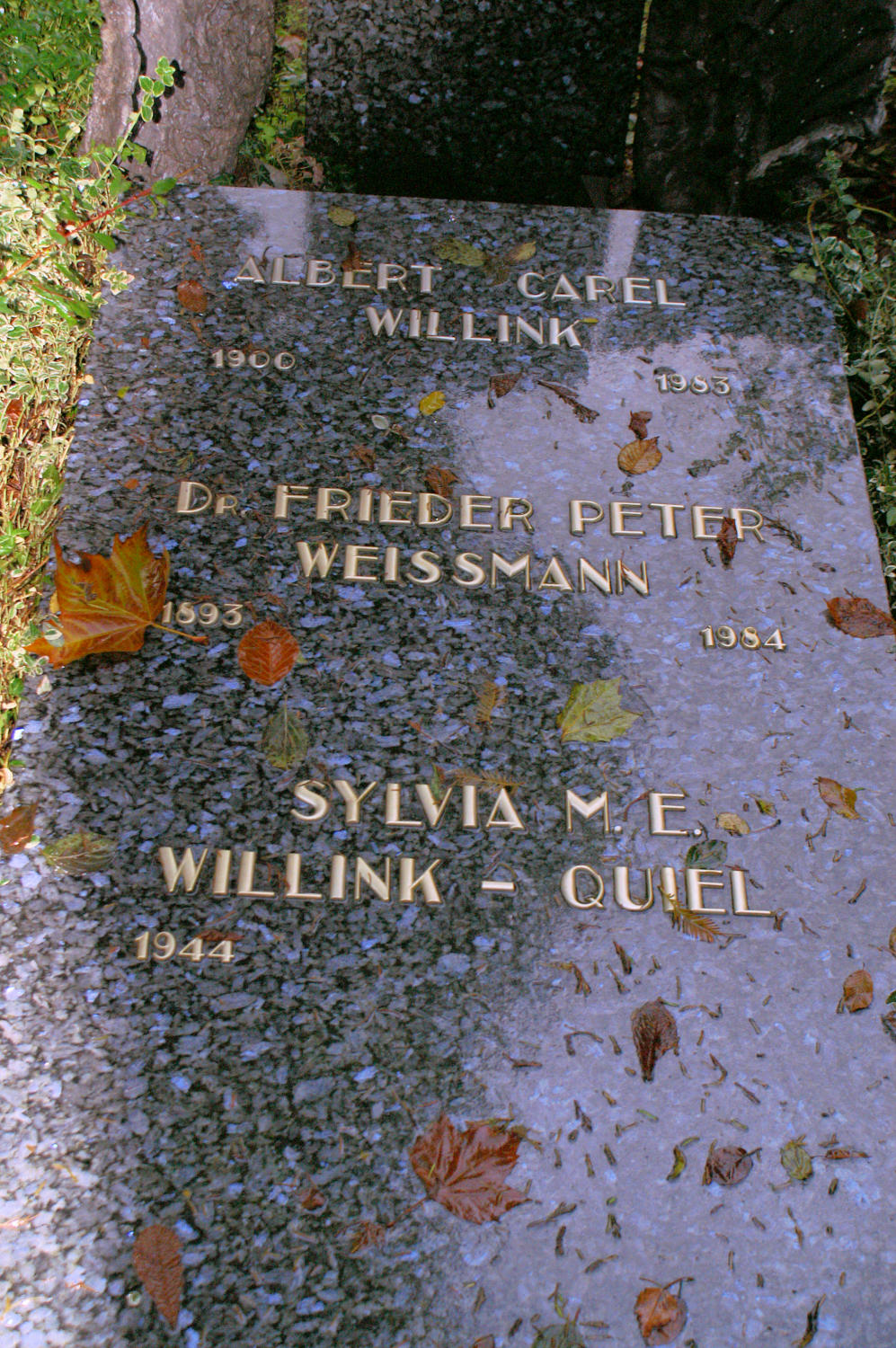
Frieder Weissmann's grave in Amsterdam's Zorgvlied cemetery

== Recording ==
DISMARC.org lists 657 entries on Weissmann.

- Akustische (Trichter-)Aufnahmen auf Parlophon in Berlin, Dirigent: Frieder Weissmann.
  - P.1265 (mx. 5593, 5594) Franz Schubert, Symphony in B minor, "Unfinished", 1. Allegro moderato
  - P.1266 (mx. 5595, 5590) 1. (Schluß), 2.Satz Andante con moto
  - P.1267 (mx. 5591, 5592) 2. Andante con moto (Fortsetzung und Schluß)
  - P.1420 (mx. 5698, 5699) Franz Liszt, Les Préludes, symphonische Dichtung I und II
  - P.1421 (mx. 5700, 5701) Franz Liszt, Les Préludes, symphonische Dichtung III und IV
  - P.1422 (mx. 5702) Franz Liszt, Les Préludes, symphonische Dichtung V

Die Rückseite mx. 6133 enthält eine Aufnahme von GMD Eduard Mörike.

on Parlophon / Beka [etc.] Hauptverzeichnis 1925/26, pp. 8–9.

- Electric recordings on Parlophon in Berlin, conductor: Frieder Weissmann.

a) Ouvertures:

  - P.9049 (mx. 20 086/087 W) Don Juan (Mozart), Ouverture
  - P.9050 (mx. 20 088/089 W) Alessandro Stradella (v. Flotow), Ouverture
  - P.9051 (mx. 20 098/099 W) Mignon (Thomas), Ouverture
  - P.9074 (mx. 20 100/101 W) Martha (v. Flotow), Ouverture
  - P.9088 (mx. 20 150/151 W) Das Nachtlager vor Granada (K. Kreutzer), Ouverture
  - P.9089 (mx. 29 171/172 W) Die weiße Dame (Boeldieu), Ouverture
  - P.9103 (mx. 20 173/174 W) Die Italienerin in Algier (Rossini), Ouverture

b) Symphonic music:

  - P.9072 (mx. 20 146/147 W) Wellingtons Sieg oder Die Schlacht bei Vittoria (L. van Beethoven, op. 91) 1.part (2 Plattenseiten)
  - P.9073 (mx. 20 148/149 W) dto., 2. part (2 Plattenseiten)
  - Symphonie c-dur (Jenaer Symphonie), also eine unbekannte Jugendsymphonie Beethovens entitles - after old parts of the Academic Concert in Jena arranged for performance and edited by Fritz Stein.
  - P.9119 (mx. 20 175 W) 1. Satz, 1. part Adagio - Allegro vivace / (mx. 20 176 W) 1.Satz, 2 Teil Allegro vivace
  - P.9120 (mx. 20 177/178 W) 3.Satz Adagio cantabile
  - P.9188 (mx. 20 536/537 W) 3.Satz Menuetto - Maestoso und Finale (Allegro)
  - P.9206 (mx. 20 599 W) Cavalleria Rusticana (Mascagni) Intermezzo sinfonico
  - P.9214 (mx. 20 365 W) Sommernachtstraum (Mendelssohn) Wedding March / (mx. 20 366 W) Sommernachtstraum (Mendelssohn) Scherzo
  - P.9230 (mx. 20 650/651 W) Ungarische Rhapsodie No.2 (Liszt)
  - P.9231 (mx. 652/653 W) The Tales of Hoffmann (Offenbach) Interlude and Minuet

on Parlophon / Beka Electric Hauptverzeichnis 1928/29, pp. 40–42.

c) Operas:

- Odéon O-6571 (xxB 7911, xxB 7912) Das Wunder der Heliane (Korngold), Zwischenspiel zum 3. act, I and II. Frieder Weissmann mit großem Symphonie-Orchester. Berlin, im December 1927.
- Odéon O-8613 (xxB.8559) Die tote Stadt (Korngold) - Duett Ich werde sie nicht wiederseh'n: Lotte Lehmann, soprano, Richard Tauber, tenor. Großes Opernorchester, Leitung: Frieder Weissmann (dismarc.org)
- Odéon O-8613 (xxB.8558) Die tote Stadt (Korngold) - Duett Glück, das mir verblieb: Lotte Lehmann, soprano, Richard Tauber, tenor. Großes Opernorchester, direction: Frieder Weissmann (dismarc.org)
- Elektrische 'Nachaufnahme' by xxB 6993 and xxB 6995 (1924) unter gleicher Bestell-Nr. O-8613. Die akustische Aufnahme von 1924 dirigierte GMD George Széll.

d) Operetta and light music:

- Odeon O-2877 a (Be 8152) In einer kleinen Konditorei. Lied und Tango (Music: Fred Raymond. Text: Ernst Neubach). Karl Pistorius with orchestral accompaniment, direction: Weissmann
- Odeon O-11 642 a (Be 9868) Was kann so schön sein. Lied a.d. Tonfilm Gitta entdeckt ihr Herz (Miklós Brodzký). Gitta Alpár mit Odeon-Künstler-Orchester, direction: Weissmann
- Odeon O-4502 b (Be 9710³) Grüß' mir mein Wien. Lied aus der Operette Gräfin Mariza. Richard Tauber with Odeon-Künstler-Orchester, direction: Weissmann. 14 January 1932 recording.
- Odeon O-4968 a (Be 8942) Rot ist dein Mund, der mich verlacht. Lied und Tango a.d. Tonfilm Das lockende Ziel (R. Tauber)
- Odeon O-4968 b (Be 8943-II) Es war einmal ein Frühlingstraum. Lied a.d. Tonfilm Das lockende Ziel (R. Tauber). Kammersänger C. Richard Tauber, tenor, with Odeon-Künstler-Orchester, direction: Weissmann.
- Odeon O-4972 a (Be 8966) Blume aus dem Wolgatal. Lied (Meyer Guzman, German text by Rotter und Robinson)
- Odeon O-4972 b (Be 8967) Märchen von Tahiti (Pagan Love Song). Song from the Metro-Goldwyn-Mayer-Tonfilm The Pagan (Nacio Herb Brown, German text by Pseudo). Chamber singer C. Richard Tauber, tenor, with orchestral accompaniment and Hawaiian Guitar (member of the Staatskapelle Berlin), conductor: Weissmann.
- Odeon O-4994 a (Be 9570) Will dir die Welt zu Füßen legen, du. Lied a.d. Optte Blume von Hawaii (Paul Abrahám)
- Odeon O-4994 b (Be 9571) Kann nicht küssen ohne Liebe. Lied a.d. Optte Blume von Hawaii (Paul Abrahám). Kammersänger C. Richard Tauber, Tenor, mit Odeon-Künstler-Orchester, Leitung: Weissmann.
- Odeon A 161.103 (Be 8851) Sprich nicht von ewiger Liebe. Lied und Tango a.d. Optte Reklame (Bruno Granichstaedten)
- Odeon A 161.104 (Be 8852) Nicht nur im Prater blüh'n wieder die Bäume. Lied (Ernst Steffan). Kammersängerin Vera Schwarz mit Orchesterbegleitung, Leitung: Weissmann.
- Odeon O-11 652 a (Be 9606) Zwei Augen, so betörend wie deine. Lied a.d. Singspiel Die Toni von Wien (Ernst Steffan, text von Steffan und Knepler). Kammersängerin Vera Schwarz mit Odeon-Künstler-Orchester, Leitung: Weissmann.
- Odeon O-4503 (Be 9780-II) Wenn wir uns später wiedersehen. Lied (Harry Ralton) Richard Tauber mit Odeon-Künstler-Orchester, Leitung: Frieder Weissmann. Aufgenommen am 9. Februar 1932 – knapp einen Monat danach verließ Tauber Deutschland.

== Reissues ==
- CD series Conductors of the past: Disco Archivia 1001: MEMORIAL TRIBUTE TO DR. FRIEDER WEISSMANN (musicinthemail.com)
- Vicky Kondelik (seinemeyer.com) nennt auf ihrer Meta Seinemeyer-home page weitere Wiederveröffentlichungen auf LP und CD.
- Johann Sebastian Bach: Cembalokonzert Nr. 7 g-moll BWV 1058 / Anna Linde (Cembalo) / Orchester der Berliner Staatsoper / Frieder Weissmann (conductor) / Aufnahme Berlin am 8. Oktober 1928 bei youtube.com. Lt Rainer Bunz „Der vergessene Maestro – Frieder Weissmann“ (2016), S. 139 „die erste Schallplattenaufnahme eines Konzerts …, bei der ein Cembalo als Soloinstrument eingesetzt wurde.“
- Ludwig van Beethoven: Sinfonie Nr. 6 F-Dur op. 68 "Pastorale" / Orchester der Berliner Staatsoper / Frieder Weissmann (conductor) / Aufnahme Berlin vom 21. und 24. November 1924 bei youtube.com.
- Ludwig van Beethoven: Klavierkonzert Nr. 4 G-Dur op. 58 / Karol Szreter (piano) / Orchester der Berliner Staatsoper / Frieder Weissmann (conductor) / Aufnahme Berlin vom 4. November 1926 bei YouTube [11] and [12]. Erste elektrische Schallplattenaufnahme des Konzerts.
- Ludwig van Beethoven: Wellingtons Sieg oder Die Schlacht bei Vittoria op. 91 / Orchester der Berliner Staatsoper / Frieder Weissmann (conductor) / Aufnahme Berlin am 23. Februar 1927 bei youtube.com.
- Arcangelo Corelli: Concerto Grosso in g-moll op. 6 Nr. 8 "Weihnachtskonzert" / Johannes Lasowski, Hans Reinicke (violins), Armin Liebermann (Viola) / Mitglieder des Orchesters der Berliner Staatsoper / Frieder Weissmann (Dirigent) / Aufnahme Berlin vom 29. November 1928 bei (youtube.com).
- Franz Liszt: Klavierkonzert Nr. 2 A-Dur / Josef Pembaur (piano) / Orchester der Berliner Staatsoper / Frieder Weissmann (Dirigent) / Aufnahme Berlin vom 28. November 1927 bei (youtube.com).
- Franz Liszt: Ungarische Rhapsodie Nr. 2 cis-moll / Karol Szreter (Klavier) / Orchester der Berliner Staatsoper / Frieder Weissmann (Dirigent) / Aufnahme Berlin im Oktober 1928 bei (youtube.com).
- Wolfgang Amadeus Mozart: Violinkonzert Nr. 5 A-Dur KV 219 / Joseph Wolfsthal (Violine) / Orchester der Berliner Staatsoper / Frieder Weissmann (Dirigent) / Aufnahme Berlin vom 19. September 1928, bei youtube.com und auf CD Pristine Classical PASC 239.
- Camille Saint-Saëns: Dance macabre op. 40 / Karol Szreter (Klavier) / mit Grand Symphony Orchestra / Frieder Weissmann (Dirigent) / Aufnahme Berlin im Oktober 1929 bei youtube.com.
- Richard Strauss: Tod und Verklärung - Tondichtung für großes Orchester op. 24 / Orchester der Berliner Staatsoper / Frieder Weissmann (Dirigent) / Aufnahme Berlin am 1. und 6. November 1929 bei youtube.com.
- Friedrich Witt (Beethoven zugeschrieben): Sinfonie in C-Dur „Jenaer" / Orchester der Berliner Staatsoper / Frieder Weissmann (Dirigent) / Aufnahme Berlin am 18. März und 21. Dezember 1927 bei charm.cch.kcl.ac.uk, charm.cch.kcl.ac.uk, charm.cch.kcl.ac.uk, charm.cch.kcl.ac.uk.
- Madame Butterfly (Puccini), Act 1 Entrance of Butterfly. Meta Seinemeyer, Soprano with Chorus and Orchestra of the State Opera House. Conductor: Weissmann. British Parlophone E.10 805 (mx. 2-20 848), aufgenommen im Juni 1928. bei youtube.com
- In einer kleinen Konditorei. Lied und Tango (Music: Fred Raymond. Text: Ernst Neubach) Karl Pistorius mit Orchesterbegleitung, Leitung: Weissmann. Odeon O-2877 a (Be 8152) bei youtube.com
- Was kann so schön sein. Lied a.d. Tonfilm Gitta entdeckt ihr Herz (Miklós Brodzký) Gitta Alpár mit Odeon-Künstler-Orchester, Leitung: Weissmann. Odeon O-11 642 a (Be 9868) bei youtube.com
- Wenn wir uns später wiedersehen. Lied (Harry Ralton) Richard Tauber mit Odeon-Künstler-Orchester, Leitung: Frieder Weissmann. Odeon O-4503 (Be 9780-II) Berlin, im Februar 1932, bei youtube.com

== Radio concert recordings ==
- Gustav Mahler: Kindertotenlieder / Lucretia West (Mezzo-soprano) / Orchestra Sinfonica di Torino della RAI / Frieder Weissmann (Dirigent) / Aufnahme vom 8.1.1960 bei youtube.com
- Wolfgang Amadeus Mozart: Klavierkonzert Nr. 20 d-moll KV 466 / Pieralberto Biondi (piano) / Orchestra "Alessandro Scarlatti" di Napoli della RAI / Frieder Weissmann (conductor) / Aufnahme vom 6.6.1961 bei youtube.com
- Johann Sebastian Bach: Passacaglia c-Moll BWV 582 in der Orchesterfassung von Ottorino Respighi / Orchestra Sinfonica di Torino della RAI / Frieder Weissmann (conductor) / Aufnahme vom 2.2.1962 bei youtube.com
- Wolfgang Amadeus Mozart: Violinkonzert Nr. 1 B-Dur KV 207 / Arthur Grumiaux (violin) / Orchestra Sinfonica di Torino della RAI / Frieder Weissmann (conductor) / Aufnahme vom 2.2.1962 bei youtube.com und auf CD Andromeda ANDRCD 9116
- Ernest Chausson: Poème op. 25 / Arthur Grumiaux (violin) / Orchestra Sinfonica di Torino della RAI / Frieder Weissmann (Dirigent) / Aufnahme vom 2.2.1962 bei youtube.com und auf CD Andromeda ANDRCD 9116
- Maurice Ravel: Tzigane Konzertrhapsodie/ Arthur Grumiaux (Violine) / Orchestra Sinfonica di Torino della RAI / Frieder Weissmann (Dirigent) / Aufnahme vom 2.2.1962 auf CD Andromeda ANDRCD 9116
- Camille Saint-Saëns: Sinfonie Nr. 3 op. 78 / Orchestra Sinfonica di Torino della RAI / Frieder Weissmann (Dirigent) / Aufnahme vom 2.2.1962 bei youtube.com
- Richard Strauss: Schlusstanz aus "Schlagobers" op. 70 / Orchestra Sinfonica di Roma della RAI / Frieder Weissmann (Dirigent) / Aufnahme vom 21.12.1963 bei youtube.com
- Gustav Mahler: Adagietto aus Sinfonie Nr. 5 / Orchestra "Alessandro Scarlatti" di Napoli della RAI / Frieder Weissmann (Dirigent) / Aufnahme vom 4.1.1969 bei youtube.com
- Richard Wagner: Siegfried-Idyll WWV 103 / Sebastiano Panebianco (Horn) / Orchestra "Alessandro Scarlatti" di Napoli della RAI / Frieder Weissmann (Dirigent) / Aufnahme vom 4.1.1969 bei youtube.com
- Jean Sibelius: Valse Triste op. 44 / Orchestra "Alessandro Scarlatti" di Napoli della RAI / Dirigent: Frieder Weissmann / Aufnahme vom 4.1.1969 bei youtube.com
- Jacques Ibert: Divertissement für Kammerorchester / Orchestra "Alessandro Scarlatti" di Napoli della RAI / Dirigent: Frieder Weissmann / Aufnahme vom 4.1.1969 bei youtube.com

== Illustrations ==
- Frieder Weissmann mit Richard Tauber (richard-tauber.de)
- Frieder Weissmann im Alter (musicinthemail.com)
- Frieder Weissmann und Meta Seinemeyer in Bad Kissingen 1929, das letzte gemeinsame Photo (seinemeyer.com)
- Plattenetikett Parlophon P.9334 Coppélia(sterkrader-radio-museum.de)
