= Hans Bund =

German pianist, conductor, composer

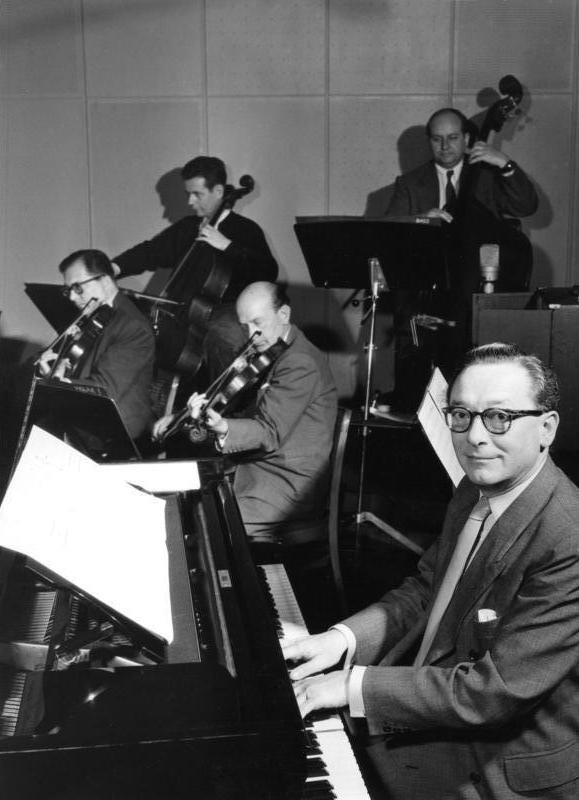
Hans Bund im Rundfunkstudio des WDR

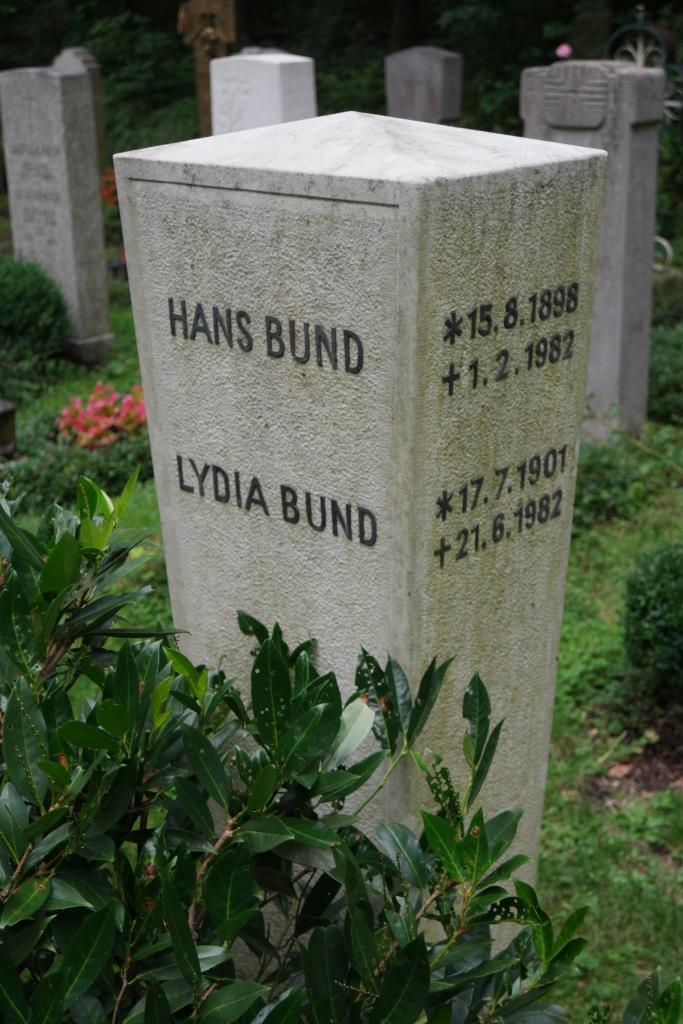
Grave of Hans Bund at the Waldfriedhof in Munich-Solln

Hans Bund, also Jack Bund, (15 August 1898 – 1 February 1982) was a German pianist, conductor, composer and arranger in the field of light music.

== Life ==
Born in Neunkirchen (Saarland), Bund received his first piano lessons from his father, who was a music teacher in Saarbrücken. He then studied piano and organ at the Rheinische Musikschule with Elly Ney and at the Hoch Conservatory in Frankfurt. Later he went to Berlin, continued his education at the Berlin University of the Arts in piano, organ, counterpoint, musical composition and conducting with Ernst von Dohnányi, among others, and graduated with distinction in 1919.

In the early 1930s, he founded the "Hans Bund Jazz Orchestra", which he led as pianist and for which he wrote the arrangements in the Berlin cabaret Schall und Rauch. In 1932 he appeared with it among others in the film Der Sieger with Hans Albers. After renaming it the Bravour Orchestra, further film and radio productions followed. He accompanied singers such as Maria Collm, Erna Sack, Mimi Thoma, Erwin Hartung, Fritzi Massary Ernst Rolf, Rudi Schuricke and Richard Tauber and produced records for Carl Lindström, Teldec, Odeon and Polydor. In 1932, coming to Funk-Stunde Berlin, he had a small ensemble for light music there in the late 1930s: "Bunds Piano-Rhythmiker". In 1942, he took over the orchestra from Otto Dobrindt.

After the end of National Socialism, he was employed in April 1946 by the British supervisor for Music at Nordwestdeutscher Rundfunk, Captain Ken Bartlett, at the Cologne radio station to put together a new band there. He then formed a 35-man orchestra, which had its first concert as early as June 1946 and from which the WDR Rundfunkorchester Köln developed in 1947. As a smaller formation, he established a new ensemble at WDR in 1948 called "Hans Bund und seine Solisten", which preferred more of a chamber music style of music-making and which he led until 1959. After leaving WDR in 1962, he moved into his retirement home in Rottach-Egern in Bavaria and continued to compose pieces in the field of light music.

Bund died in Rottach-Egern at the age of 83.

== Compositions ==
- Eine kleine Dorfgeschichte (1938)
- Erinnerung an ein Ballerlebnis (1939)
- In spanischen Gärten
- Albernes und Frivoles
- The little guards
- Fest im Belvedere
- Eine Viertelstund
- Liebe und Leben
- Der Charmeur
- Spanischer Tanz
- Blumen im Wind
- Con amore
- Tanz der Puppen

== Recordings ==
- My Baby Parlafone 1932
- Vägen som går dit är lång lång lång (with Ernst Rolf), 1932
- Teddybärs Picknick, Odeon O-11744b
- Für ein bisschen Sonne (Bathing in the sunshine), Telefunken O-11658b
- Peter, Peter (with Gerda Gerold), Odeon O-11640b
- Auf einem Regenbogen (I'm dancing on a rainbow), Telefunken 1932
- Ein Lied geht um die Welt Telefunken 1933
- Orient-Express, Telefunken 1933
- SOS, Telefunken 1934
- Marietta, with Rudi Schuricke, Imperial 1938
- Kannst Du pfeifen, Johanna, with Erwin Hartung, Telefunken A1546
- Was bin ich ohne Dich, with Erwin Hartung, Telefunken A1665
- Was bin ich ohne dich Telefunken A1665
- Für eine Nacht voll Seligkeit, Polydor 1941
- Die alte Laube (from Briefe des Herzens), with Mimi Thoma, Polydor 47809/B
- Die Moritat vom kleinen Gedanken, with Mimi Thoma, Polydor 47985/A
- Wenn es Frühling wird, Bunds's Piano Rhythmiker, Parlophon 11570, 1941
- Nur eine Nacht voller Seligkeit, Bunds's Piano Rhythmiker, Parlophon 11570, 1941
- Wiener Bonbon, Hans Bund, großes Tanzorchester, Polydor 47590A, 1941
- Geschichten aus dem Wiener Wald, Hans Bund, großes Tanzorchester, Polydor 47590B, 1941
- Frühlingsstimmen, Hans Bund, Tanzorchester, Polydor 47650A, 1941
- An der schönen blauen Donau, Hans Bund, Tanzorchester, Polydor 47650B, 1941
- Ja, grün ist die Heide, Hans Bund, Bravour-Tanzorchester, Odeon O-11714a
- Harlekin, Hans Bund, Bravour-Tanzorchester, Odeon O-11714b
- Das war der Graf von Rüdesheim, Orchester Hans Bund, Gesang Willi Weiss, Telefunken A1511
- Bremer Stadtmusikanten, Orchester Hans Bund, Gesang Willi Weiss, Telefunken A1511
- Wenn der Brummbaß brummt, bin ich verliebt, Orchester Hans Bund, Ges.Erwin Hartung, Telefunken A1617
- Horch, der Kuckuck!, Orchester Hans Bund, Gesang Erwin Hartung, Telefunken A1617
- Ganz leis' erklingt Musik, Orchester Hans Bund, Gesang Rudi Schuricke, Polydor 47595A mx. 19½GX9

== Filmography ==
- Der Sieger, director: Hans Hinrich, with Hans Albers among others, Berlin 1932
- Das himmelblaue Abendkleid, director: Erich Engels, Berlin 1941
