= Fétique =

Fétique is a French surname. Notable people with the surname include:

- Fétique (bow makers)
  - Victor Fétique (1872–1933), French archetier
  - Jules Fétique (1875–1951), French archetier
  - Marcel Fétique (1899–1977), French archetier
  - André Richaume (1905–1966), French archetier
