= Fétique (bow makers) =

Family of French bow makers

Fétique was a family of French bow makers, notable members include Victor François Fétique and Jules Fétique, both of whom were awarded Meilleur Ouvrier de France (1st Craftsman of France), and Marcel Fétique.

== Family ==
Head of the family was Charles Claude Fétique (1853–1911), who was a violin maker. He had two bow-making sons, Victor Fétique (1872–1933) and Jules Fétique (1875–1951), and a daughter Marie Augustine Marthe Fétique (1879–1928). Victor François Fétique had a son Marcel Fétique (1899–1977). Marie Augustine Marthe had a son André Richaume (1905–1966).

- Victor Fétique studied bow making in Mirecourt, working for Charles Nicolas Bazin, before joining Caressa & Français in Paris in 1901. From 1913 he worked independently.
- Jules Fétique worked also for C. N. Bazin before becoming assistant to Eugène Sartory. He joined Caressa & Francais in 1917.
- Marcel Fétique apprenticed with his father Victor Fétique. After his father's death, set up on his own as successor to his father.
- André Richaume apprenticed with Émile François Ouchard in Mirecourt. After that joined his uncle Victor Fétique in Paris. He worked on his own from 1923 to 1957.
