= Stradivarius =

String instruments built by the Stradivari family, particularly Antonio

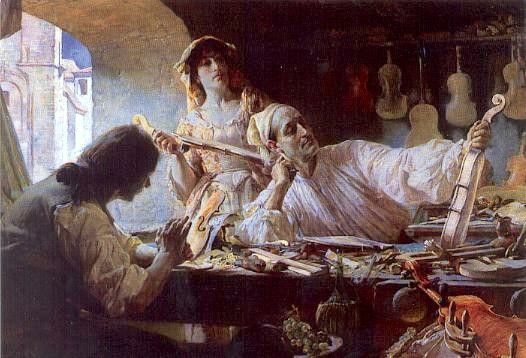
Antonio Stradivari, by Edgar Bundy, 1893: a romanticized image of a craftsman-hero

A Stradivarius is a string instrument, such as a violin, viola, cello, or guitar, crafted during the late 17th and early 18th centuries by Antonio Stradivari (Latin: Antonius Stradivarius) and other members of the Stradivari family in Cremona, Italy. These instruments are known for their craftsmanship, tonal quality, and lasting legacy, and are considered some of the finest ever made. Stradivari's violins, in particular, are coveted by musicians and collectors, with many selling for millions.

Antonio Stradivari made over 1,100 instruments, with approximately 650 surviving today. The exact methods Stradivari used to produce the instruments' famed sound remain unknown, with theories ranging from the unique quality of the wood used during the Little Ice Age to the varnishes and chemical treatments applied. Despite extensive scientific research, including modern acoustic analysis and CT scans, no one has conclusively replicated or fully explained the tonal qualities of Stradivarius instruments.

The reputation of Stradivarius instruments for having unmatched sound quality has been debated. Blind experiments conducted since the 19th century have often found no significant difference between Stradivari instruments and high-quality modern violins. These findings have made some question the objectivity of the instruments' legendary status.

Stradivarius instruments are still played by leading musicians and housed in museums worldwide, such as the Museo del Violino in Cremona, which preserves several Stradivarius instruments. Initiatives like the Stradivarius Sound Bank have aimed to digitally capture and preserve the sounds of these instruments for future generations. Stradivarius instruments have become known in popular culture, appearing in fiction and representing elite musical artistry.

== Construction ==
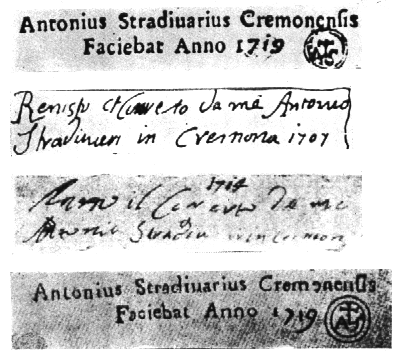
Maker's label from Stradivari

Stradivari made his instruments using an inner form, unlike the French copyists, such as Vuillaume, who employed an outer form. It is clear from the number of forms throughout his career that he experimented with some of the dimensions of his instruments. The woods used included spruce for the top, willow for the internal blocks and linings, and maple for the back, ribs, and neck. Stradivari's sound is described as "direct and precise", responding to the slightest touch with refined direction and elegance.

There has been conjecture that the wood used may have been treated with several types of minerals, both before and after the construction of a violin. Scientists at National Taiwan University found trace amounts of aluminum, copper, and calcium in wood from Stradivari violins. The traces may have come from chemical preservatives applied by loggers to the wood they sold. As well, the violin makers applied varnishes to their instruments. Potassium borate (borax) may have been used to protect against woodworm. Sodium and potassium silicate may have been used to prevent mildew, rotting and insect damage. Simone Fernando Sacconi suggested that Vernice bianca, an egg tempera varnish composed of gum arabic, honey, and egg white, may have been used.

French chemist Jean-Philippe Echard and his co-workers have studied varnishes on Stradivarius violins. He reported in 2010 that even when varnish is no longer visible to the human eye on the surface of older violins, it can be detected within the top layers of cells. A lower layer of varnish is found within the topmost wood cells, while an upper layer rests upon the wood. Echard's findings suggest that Stradivari used a mixture of common Cremonese resin, oil, and pigment as a varnish, rather than making his own. Echard did not find traces of specialized ingredients such as protein materials, gums, or fossil amber.

A comparative study published in PLOS One in 2008 found no significant differences in median densities between modern and classical violins, or between classical violins from different origins; instead, the survey of several modern and classical examples of violins highlighted a notable distinction when comparing density differentials. These results suggest that differences in density differentials in the material may have played a significant role in the sound production of classical violins. A later survey, focused on comparing median densities in both classical and modern violin examples, questioned the role available materials may have played in sound production differences, though it did not comment on variations in density differentials. The content of copper and aluminium is higher than current instruments.

Stradivari's violins are often seen as the pinnacle of classical instrument making, yet the origins of the wood used to construct their soundboards have remained unclear. By analysing 314 tree-ring series from 284 authenticated instruments, it has been shown that the majority of soundboards were crafted from Norway spruce that grew at very high elevations during the severe climatic conditions of the time. Data reveals that Stradivari frequently used wood from the same tree for multiple instruments and that its sources can be traced to the Eastern Alps. Comparison with many reference chronologies indicates that Stradivari's early work drew on diverse and less easily localised sources. During his "golden age" of production from the early eighteenth century onwards, he consistently selected spruce from high-altitude forests in Trentino, Italy, and most likely from the Val di Fiemme in particular. These findings provide the first large-scale dendrochronological evidence for the geographic and environmental origins of Stradivari's wood and offer new insights into both historical instrument making and the interplay between climate, materials, and musical heritage.

== Market value ==
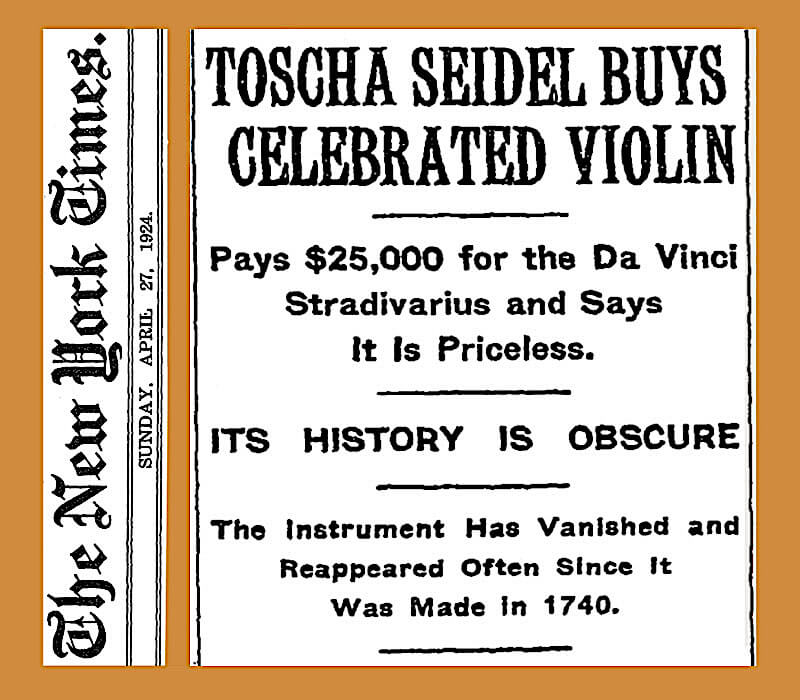
In 1924, Toscha Seidel bought the Da Vinci Stradivarius violin for $25,000 (equivalent to $469,660 in 2025) from a private dealer from Berlin.

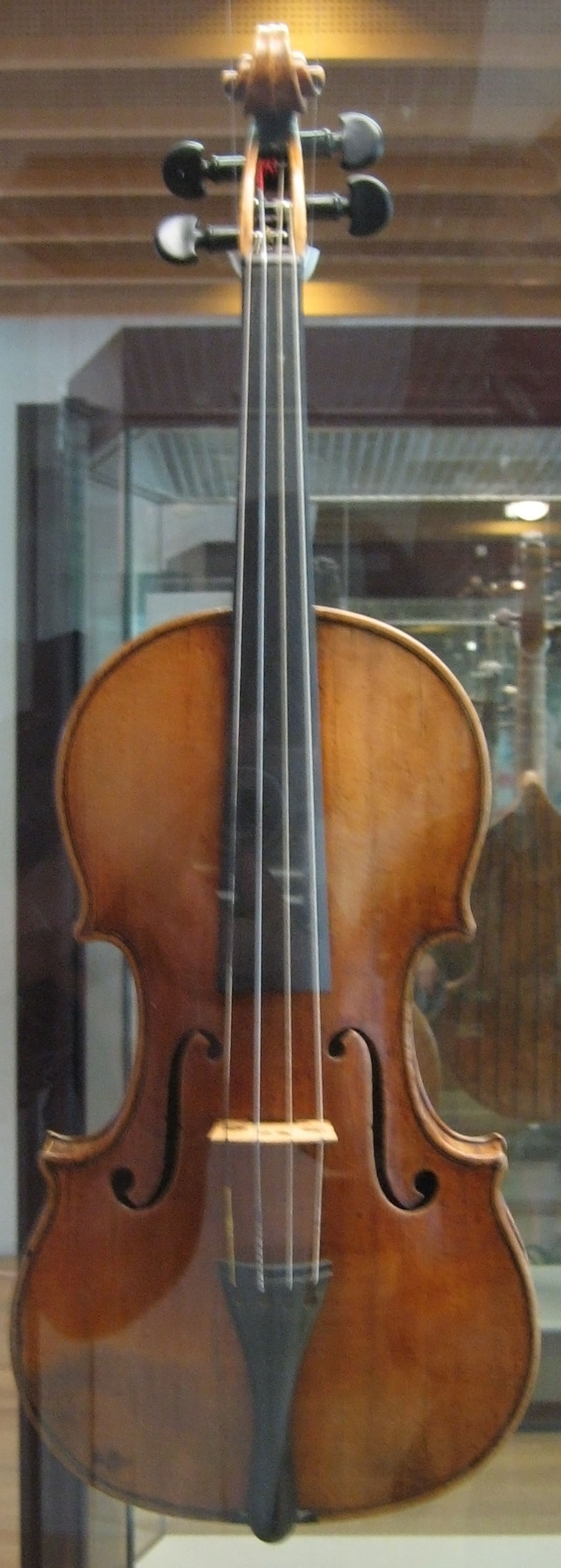
Antonio Stradivari violin of 1703 on exhibit, behind glass, at the Musikinstrumentenmuseum (Berlin Musical Instrument Museum), 2006

A Stradivarius made in the 1680s, or during Stradivari's "Long Pattern" period from 1690 to 1700, could be worth hundreds of thousands to several million U.S. dollars at today's prices. The 1697 "Molitor" Stradivarius, once rumored to have belonged to Napoleon (it actually belonged to a general in his army, Marshal Gabriel Jean Joseph Molitor, 1er Comte Molitor), sold in 2010 at Tarisio Auctions to violinist Anne Akiko Meyers for $3,600,000, at the time a world record.

Depending on condition, instruments made during Stradivari's "golden period" from 1700 to about 1725 can be worth millions of dollars. In 2011, his "Lady Blunt" violin from 1721, which is in pristine condition, was sold in London for $15.9 million (it is named after Lord Byron's granddaughter Lady Anne Blunt, who owned it for 30 years). It was sold by the Nippon Music Foundation in aid of the Japanese earthquake and tsunami appeal. In Spring 2014 the "Macdonald" viola was put up for auction through the musical instrument auction house Ingles & Hayday in conjunction with Sotheby's via silent auction with a minimum bid of $45 million. The auction failed to reach its minimum bid by 25 June 2014, and the viola was not sold.

Vice magazine reported in May 2013 that "in recent years, Stradivarius investment funds have started to appear, pushing already astronomical prices even higher".

Stradivarius instruments are at risk of theft. Stolen instruments are often recovered, even after being missing for many years. They are difficult to sell illicitly, as dealers will typically call the police if approached by a seller with a Stradivarius known to have been stolen. The General Kyd Stradivarius was stolen in 2004. It was returned three weeks later by a woman who found it and handed it over to the police. The Sinsheimer/Iselin was stolen in Hanover, Germany in 2008 and recovered in 2009. The Lipinski Stradivarius was stolen in an armed robbery on 27 January 2014 and subsequently recovered. The Ames Stradivarius was stolen in 1981 and recovered in 2015.

Several stolen instruments remain missing, such as the Karpilowsky, stolen in 1953; the Davidoff-Morini, stolen in 1995; and the Le Maurien, stolen in 2002.

== Comparisons in sound quality ==
The Stradivarius instruments are famous for the quality of sound they produce. However, the many blind experiments from 1817 to as recent as 2014 have never found any difference in sound between Stradivari's violins and high-quality violins in comparable style of other makers and periods, nor has acoustic analysis. In a particularly famous test on a BBC Radio 3 programme in 1977, the violinists Isaac Stern and Pinchas Zukerman and the violin expert and dealer Charles Beare tried to distinguish between the "Chaconne" Stradivarius, a 1739 Guarneri del Gesú, an 1846 Vuillaume, and a 1976 British violin played behind a screen by a professional soloist. The two violinists were allowed to play all the instruments first. None of the listeners identified more than two of the four instruments. Two of the listeners identified the 20th-century violin as the Stradivarius. Violinists and others have criticized these tests on various grounds such as that they are not double-blind (in most cases), the judges are often not experts, and the sounds of violins are hard to evaluate objectively and reproducibly.

In a test in 2009, the British violinist Matthew Trusler played his 1711 Stradivarius, said to be worth two million U.S. dollars, and four modern violins made by the Swiss violin-maker Michael Rhonheimer. One of Rhonheimer's violins, made with wood that the Swiss Federal Laboratories for Materials Science and Technology researcher Francis Schwarze had treated with fungi, received 90 of the 180 votes for the best tone, while the Stradivarius came second with 39 votes. The majority (113) of the listeners misidentified the winning violin as the Stradivarius. Analysis of the treated wood revealed a reduction in density, accompanied by relatively little change in the speed of sound. According to this analysis, treatment improves the sound radiation ratio to the level of cold-climate wood considered to have superior resonance.

In a double-blind test in 2012 published in the study "Player preferences among new and old violins", expert players could not distinguish old from new instruments by playing them for a short time in a small room. In an additional test, performed in a concert hall, one of the Stradivarius violins placed first, but one of the participants stated that "the audience in the concert hall were essentially equivocal on which instruments were better in each of the pair-wise instrument comparisons" and "I could tell slight differences in the instruments... but overall they were all great. None of them sounded substantially weaker than the others." Modern violins were rated as having better sound-carrying qualities and were preferred again in a study in 2017.

While many world-class soloists play violins by Antonio Stradivari, some prefer other makers. For example, Christian Tetzlaff formerly played "a quite famous Strad", but switched to a violin made in 2002 by Stefan-Peter Greiner. He states that the listener cannot tell that his instrument is modern, and he regards it as excellent for Bach and better than a Stradivarius for "the big Romantic and 20th-century concertos."

== Theories and reproduction attempts ==
Some maintain that the very best Stradivari have unique superiorities. Various attempts at explaining these supposed qualities have been undertaken, most results being unsuccessful or inconclusive. Over the centuries, numerous theories have been presented—and debunked—including an assertion that the wood was salvaged from old cathedrals.

A more modern theory attributes tree growth during a time of global low temperatures during the Little Ice Age associated with unusually low solar activity of the Maunder Minimum, circa 1645 to 1750, during which cooler temperatures throughout Europe are believed to have caused stunted and slowed tree growth, resulting in unusually dense wood. Further evidence for this "Little Ice Age theory" comes from a simple examination of the dense growth rings in the wood used in Stradivari's instruments. Two researchers—University of Tennessee tree-ring scientist Henri Grissino-Mayer and Lloyd Burckle, a Columbia University climatologist—published their conclusions supporting the theory on increased wood density in the journal Dendrochronologia.

In 2008, researchers from the Leiden University Medical Center in the Netherlands announced further evidence that wood density caused the claimed high quality of these instruments. After examining the violins with X-rays, the researchers found that these violins all have extremely consistent density, with relatively low variation in the apparent growth patterns of the trees that produced this wood.

Yet another possible explanation is that the maple wood used was sourced from the forests of northern Croatia. This wood is known for its extreme density resulting from the slow growth caused by harsh Croatian winters. Croatian wood was traded by Venetian merchants of the era, and is still used today by local luthiers and craftsfolk for musical instruments.

Some research points to wood preservatives used in that day as contributing to the resonant qualities. Joseph Nagyvary reveals that he has always held the belief that there is a wide range of chemicals that will improve the violin's sound. In a 2009 study co-authored with Renald Guillemette and Clifford Spiegelman, Nagyvary obtained shavings from a Stradivarius violin and examined them, and analysis indicated they contained "borax, fluorides, chromium and iron salts." He also found that the wood had decayed a little, to the extent that the filter plates in the pores between the wood's component tracheids had rotted away, perhaps while the wood was stored in or under water in the Venice lagoon before Stradivarius used it.

Steven Sirr, a radiologist, worked with researchers to perform a CT scan of a Stradivari known as the "Betts". Data regarding the differing densities of woods used were then used to create a reproduction instrument.

== Instruments ==
Stradivari made mainly violins but also violas, cellos, and some plucked string instruments (five guitars, two mandolins, and one harp are known). About 650 original Stradivarius instruments have survived. Thousands of violins have been made in tribute to Stradivari, copying his model and bearing labels that read "Stradivarius". The presence of a Stradivarius label does not confirm that the instrument is a genuine work of Stradivari.

Recordings made with original Stradivarius string instruments

- Fabio Biondi, Antonio Fantinuoli, Giangiacomo Pinardi, Paola Poncet. Francesco Maria Veracini, Francesco Geminiani, Arangelo Corelli, Giuseppe Tartini, Pietro Antonio Locatelli, Antonio Vivaldi. The 1690 'Tuscan' Stradivari. Label: Glossa
- L'Archibudelli. Franz Schubert. Quintet in C D. 956, Rondo in A D. 438. Label: Sony
- L'Archibudelli, Smithsonian Chamber Players. George Onslow. Quintets Opp. 38, 39 & 40. Label: Sony
- L'Archibudelli, Smithsonian Chamber Players. Felix Mendelssohn, Niels Gade. Octets for Strings. Label: Sony
- Frank Peter Zimmermann, Antoine Tamestit, Christian Poltéra. Ludwig van Beethoven. String Trios, Op. 9. Label: BIS
- Ralph Holmes, Richard Burnett. Johann Nepomuk Hummel. Works for Violin and Piano. Label: Amon-Ra
- Paolo Ghidoni, Alfredo Zamarra. Luigi Gatti. Six Sonatas for Violin & Viola. Label: Brilliant Classics
- Steven Isserlis, Robert Levin. Ludwig van Beethoven. Cello Sonatas. Label: Hyperion
- Rainer Kussmaul, Andreas Staier, Concerto Köln. Felix Mendelssohn. Piano Concerto in A minor, Concerto for Piano and Violin in D minor. Label: Teldec
- Isabelle Faust, Pavlo Beznosiuk, Orchestra of the Age of Enlightenment. Wolfgang Amadeus Mozart, Joseph Haydn. Sinfonia Concertante; Violin Concerti 1 & 4. Label: Channel Classics
- Isabelle Faust, Anne Katharina Schreiber, Antoine Tamestit, Jean-Guihen Queyras, Alexander Melnikov. Robert Schumann. Piano Quartet & Quintet. Label: Harmonia Mundi
- Isabelle Faust, Alexander Melnikov, Boris Faust, and Wolfgang Emanuel Schmidt. Carl Maria von Weber. Sonatas for violin and piano, Piano Quartet. Label: Harmonia Mundi
- Isabelle Faust, Alexander Melnikov, Teunis van der Zwart. Johannes Brahms. Horn Trio Op. 40, Violin Sonata Op. 78, Fantasies Op. 116. Label: Harmonia Mundi
- Isabelle Faust, Alexander Melnikov. Albert Dietrich, Robert Schumann, Johannes Brahms. Violin Sonatas Op. 100 & 108. Label: Harmonia Mundi
- Alexander Melnikov, Isabelle Faust, Salagon Quartet. Franck, Chausson. Label: Harmonia Mundi, 2017.
- Gudrun Schaumann, Wolfgang Brunner. Clara Schumann, Albert Dietrich, Robert Schumann, Johannes Brahms, Carl Reinecke, Theodor Kirchner, Woldemar Bargiel, Joseph Joachim. The Circle of Robert Schumann. Label: Capriccio
- Antti Tikkanen, Markus Hohti, Joonas Ahonen (Rödberg Trio). Fanny Mendelssohn, Felix Mendelssohn. The Mendelssohn Siblings. Label: Alba Records
- Anne-Sophie Mutter, Across the Stars, Various works by John Williams. Label: Deutsche-Grammophon
- Anne Sofie von Otter, Melvyn Tan, Erich Hoeprich, Nils-Erik Sparf, Christina Högman, Christina Högman. Ludwig van Beethoven, Giacomo Meyerbeer, Louis Spohr. Lieder, Mélodies. Label: Archiv Produktion
- Janine Jansen, Antonio Pappano. 12 Stradivari, Various works by Falla, Suk, C. Schumann, Schumann, Vieuxtemps, Tchaikovsky, Szymanowski, Ravel, Elgar, Rachmaninoff, Heuberger, Kreisler, Kern on 12 different Stradivari brought together. Label: Decca 4851605 (2021)

Recordings made with replicas of Stradivarius string instruments

- Roel Dieltiens, Andreas Staier. Ludwig van Beethoven. Cello Sonatas & Bagatelles: Opp. 102, 11,9 and 126. Label: Harmonia Mundi. Cello by Marten Cornelissen (1994).
- Jaroslaw Thiel, Katarzyna Drogosz. Ludwig van Beethoven. Sonatas Op. 5, Variations WoO 45. Label: Narodowe Forum Muzyki. Cello by Bastian Muthesius (2004).

== Sound preservation ==
The Museo del Violino in Cremona, Italy, embarked on a project to preserve the sound of Stradivarius instruments. In January 2019, four musicians recorded scales and arpeggios using two violins, a viola, and a cello, including a famous 1727 violin named "Vesuvio." These recordings, known as the "Stradivarius Sound Bank," preserve the sounds. The project involved closing off streets and minimizing noise to ensure a quiet environment during the recordings. The musicians recorded over one million sound files across different techniques to capture the instruments' tonal characteristics. These recordings are stored as part of a permanent collection at the Museo del Violino. Fausto Cacciatori, curator of the museum, emphasized that while the sounds of these instruments change over time due to natural aging, the project will allow future generations to experience the original sound of these Stradivarius instruments.
