= Da Vinci, ex-Seidel Stradivarius =

Violin by Antonio Stradivari in 1714

The Da Vinci, ex-Seidel Stradivarius is a violin made by Antonio Stradivari of Cremona, Italy in 1714.

== Provenance ==
The violin was owned until 1880 by Arthur Foucques d’Émonville, a French botanist. A year later, it was sold by Hôtel Drouot to Vicomte Frédéric de Janzé, a collector of antiques and Italian violins. In 1888, the violin was sold by Chardon & Fils to Antoine Jacques Fourchy, a notaire and amateur violinist. In 1914, it reappeared in Paris in a shop owned by Caressa & Français and was sold in 1923 to Charles Tunsch, a dealer and financier from Berlin. He quickly sold the instrument to one of his close associates, Emil Herrmann, who then took it to New York. On April 27, 1924, the violin was sold to Toscha Seidel for $25,000. He used the violin throughout his performing and recording career including in movies such as The Wizard of Oz, The Great Waltz, and Melody for Three. After Seidel's death in 1962, it was sold to violinist Muriel Rubin in Los Angeles. In 1974, the violin was sold by Sotheby's to an anonymous individual for £34,000.

In 2007, the violin was bought by Japanese businessman Tokuji Munetsugu. The instrument became part of the Munetsugu Collection of Nagoya, Japan. In 2008, it was temporarily featured in the Stradivari exposition at the Musée Fabre.

On June 9, 2022, the Da Vinci, ex-Seidel Stradivarius appeared in a public auction for the first time since 1974 and was projected to be sold between $15 and $20 million USD. The violin ended up being sold at US$15.34 million.

== Instrument ==
In Alberta Caressa's March 24, 1923 description of the violin, he writes "baptisé par nous ‘Le Léonard de Vinci’ (baptized by us ‘the Leonardo da Vinci.’)” thus giving the violin its name.

In 2003, professor of biochemistry and biophysics at Texas A&M University, Joseph Nagyvary, crafted a violin that was tested in a blind duel with the Da Vinci, ex-Seidel Stradivarius. Violinist Dalibor Karvay played excerpts from the Carmen Fantasie by Waxman and Violin Sonata No. 1 by Prokofiev behind a screen in front of an audience of professional musicians and concertgoers. After an audience vote, the Stradivarius was ranked (out of a scale from 1 to 10) at an average of 7.83 for quality and 7.8 for power while the instrument by Nagyvary received a 8.03 for quality and 8.23 for power.

== See also ==
- List of Stradivarius instruments
