= Carl Fredrick Becker =

American luthier and restorer (1919–2013)

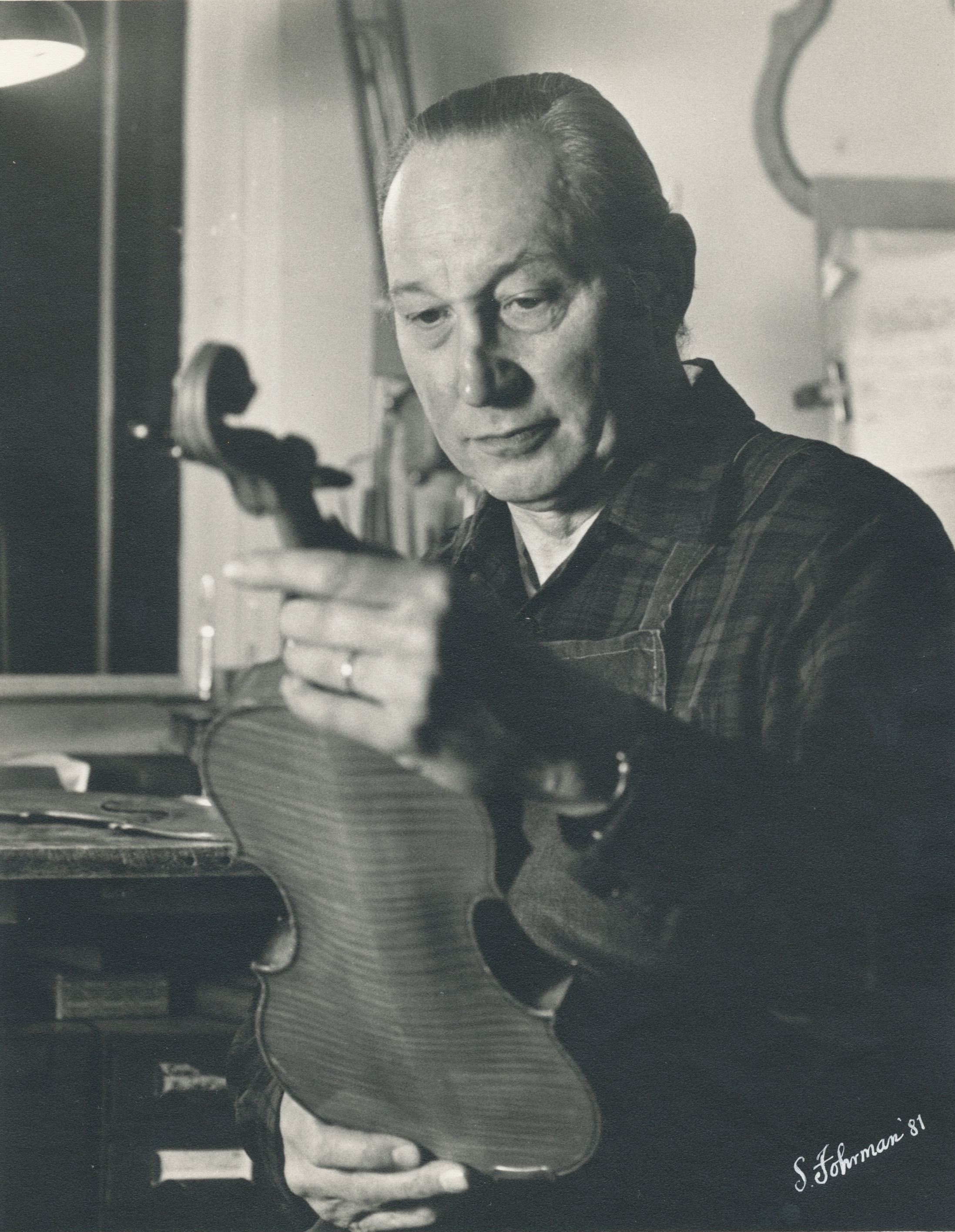
- Born: Carl Fredrick Becker; 1919; Chicago (Illinois), United States
- Died: January 30, 2013; Park Ridge (Illinois), United States
- Occupation: Luthier
- Years active: 1937 - 2013
- Spouse: Geraldine Smetana
- Children: Paul Becker; Jennifer Becker; Carol Henderson; Marilyn Becker

Carl Fredrick Becker (also known as Carl F. Becker and Carl Becker Jr.) (1919 – January 30, 2013) was an American luthier and restorer, known for restoring the "Lady Blunt" 1721 Stradivarius violin. He had a reputation as "one of America's finest violin makers" and “the dean of American violin-making”.

Becker was a founding member of both the International Association of Violin and Bow Makers (Entente Internationale des Luthiers et Archetiers) and the American Federation of Violin and Bowmakers. Several important American luthiers trained under his guidance including Peter Beare, Eric Benning (of Benning Violins), Charles Rufino, Sebastian Zens and Samuel Zygmuntowicz.

== Biography ==
Becker was born in the family of Carl G. Becker in 1919 in Chicago. He started apprenticing with his father at age 16, while still at school, making cello ribs. After graduating from high school in 1937 he worked for William Lewis & Son Co. under his father's supervision.

In 1941, Becker was called into the military service and joined United States Air Force where became a trainer of other pilots, finishing his military career at the rank of Major. After World War II ended, he continued the family tradition of violin-making.

From 1946 to 1968, Becker worked with his father for William Lewis & Son. The Strad magazine reports that the couple made their first “Carl Becker and Son” violin in 1948 however it wasn't until 1968 when they opened their own shop in a multi-level building on Belmont St. in Chicago that served as the family's shop as well as their home. Their shop was offering new instruments, valuable old Italian instruments as well as repair and restoration services. With the few exceptions, all "Carl Becker and Son" violins constructed between 1946 and 1975 were made jointly by father and son who divided the labor (his father was responsible for the arching, while he did the carving of neck and scroll). Together they made over 500 instruments.

After the death of his father in 1975, Becker made by himself only 13 instruments. Much of his violin-making happened at the secluded cabin in Wisconsin by Lake Pickerel, where he worked in a studio over the garage and practiced muskie fishing. His time in Chicago was devoted to repairing and restoring violins. During 1970 and 1971, Becker restored the famous "Lady Blunt" 1721 Stradivarius violin. Shortly after that, the violin sold at an auction for the record amount of $201 000.

Becker's children, Jennifer and Paul, continued the family tradition of violin making. Jennifer started her first violin in 1966, at age 11 and completed it at age 15. In 1970 (at the age of 16) she joined the company full-time. In 1978 she moved to Minneapolis and started her own violin making business. Paul Becker joined the company in 1971 at the age of 14. He is the current owner of “Carl Becker and Son”.

Becker died in January 2013 at the age of 93.
