= Giovanni Lucchi =

Italian violin bow maker (1942–2012)

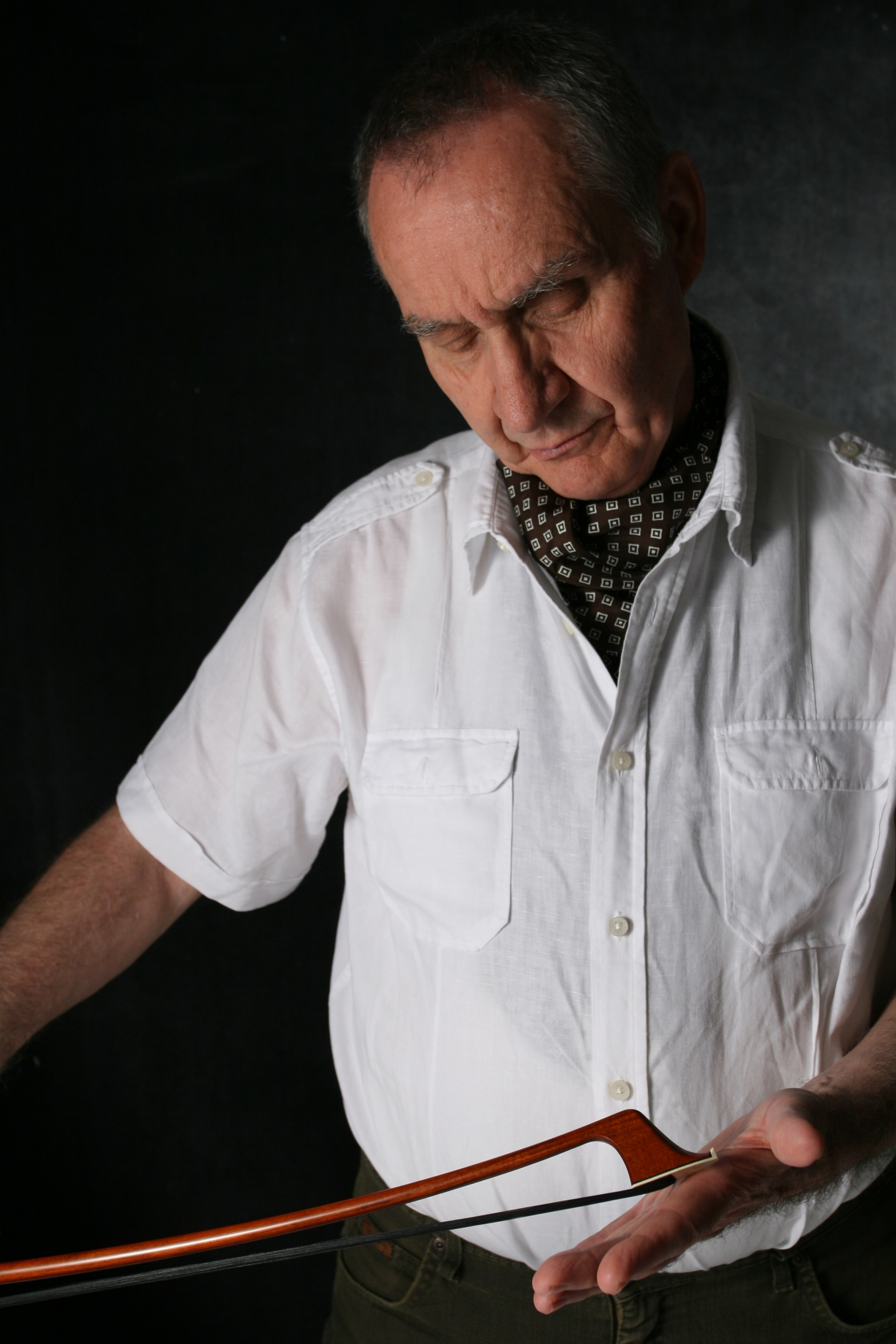
Giovanni Lucchi

Giovanni Lucchi (21 August 1942, in Cesena, Italy – 2 August 2012, in Cremona, Italy) was an Italian bow maker noted for founding the first school of bow making in Italy.

== Background ==
Giovanni Lucchi trained as a double bassist, graduating from the Conservatorio Statale di Musica "Gioachino Rossini" in Pesaro in 1963. He worked for several years as a musician and instructor, and in 1971, he began constructing and restoring bows. He went to Brienz, Switzerland to apprentice under Siegfried Finkel.

== Career ==
In 1976, Lucchi founded a school for bowmaking in Cremona, Italy, where he taught courses in bow construction, maintenance and restoration, as well as style and design.

In 1983, Lucchi invented the Lucchi Meter, a device used to measure the speed of sound in wood that has become a standard tool for bow makers. It is used to assess the sound quality of pieces of pernambuco.

Lucchi was active within the community of luthiers and bow makers, holding various posts among professional societies and writing and speaking often in journals and conferences relating to the art. He had a good reputation, having been the bow maker for artists like Mstislav Rostropovich, Pinchas Zukerman, and Gary Karr.

== Pupils ==
Giovanni Lucchi had a lot of pupils, many of whom later became significant artists in their own right, such as: Emilio Slaviero, Daniel Tobias Navea Vera, Pietro Cavalazzi, Giorgio Grisales, Francisco Gonzalez Espinoza, Octavio Aranda, Andreas Grütter, Llorenç Fenollosa, Zheng Quan, Arturo Moreno, Juliane Schanzenbach, Paolo Pamiro, Andrea Proietti, Arturo Ponce, Gastaldi Marco Maria, Ivan Delgado e Michalis Pantelides.

== Professional activities ==
- Secretary, Italian Association of Violin and Bow Makers (1991 to 1992)
- President, Violin and Bow Makers of the Artisans' Association of the Province of Cremona (1991 to 1998)
- Representative for Cremona to the Triennale Assembly (1995 - 1998)
- Member of the European Association of Master Violin and Bow Makers (1996 - 2000)

== Publications ==
- Lucchi, Giovanni (2012). Bowmaking: Passion of a Lifetime. Fondazione Lucchi Cremona. ISBN 9788890868344.
- Lucchi, Giovanni (October 2008). "Repairing a bow using a toothed patch". The Strad.
- Lucchi, Giovanni (June 2008). "LucchiMeter". The Strad.
- Lucchi, Giovanni (1998). "How to Visualize Il Bel Suono in Real Time". Journal of the Violin Society of America. 16 (3).
- Lucchi, Giovanni (1996). The Bow, Multimedia CD-ROM
- Lucchi, Giovanni (1988). "The Use of Empirical and Scientific Methods to Measure the Velocity of Propagation of Sound". Journal of the Violin Society of America. 9 (1).

== Lucchi Foundation ==
The "Fondazione Lucchi" has been established with the desire to continue Lucchi's work. The foundation promotes research, material discovery, and knowledge of the violin bow.
