= Lynne P. Sullivan =

American archaeologist (born 1952)

Lynne Sullivan (born December 25, 1952) is an American archaeologist and former Curator of Archaeology for the Frank H. McClung Museum located on the University of Tennessee campus in Knoxville, Tennessee. A graduate of the University of Tennessee (undergraduate) and the University of Wisconsin–Milwaukee (Masters and PhD), Sullivan is renowned for her research and publications on subjects such as Southeastern United States prehistory, Mississippian chiefdoms, mortuary analysis, and archaeological curation. She has been a major contributor to the feminist/gender archaeology movement through her studies in social inequality, gender roles, and the historic significance of women in the development of modern archaeology.

== Background and education ==
Sullivan was born in Kingsport, Tennessee on December 25, 1952. However, she spent the duration of her childhood in Cleveland, Tennessee, after her family's move to the small city near Chattanooga when Sullivan was one. Her father worked for Bowater Paper Company, while her mother, the daughter of German immigrants, raised Sullivan and her two younger sisters. Sullivan's interest in archaeology stemmed from a childhood love of National Geographic magazine. Through membership in her local Girl Scout troop, Sullivan received the opportunity to participate in her first excavation at the age of 17. The dig took place in Iowa during the summer of 1970, following her graduation from Cleveland High School.

That fall, Sullivan entered her freshman year at the University of Tennessee in Knoxville. In 1971 she applied to work on a dig and was denied the opportunity due to her sex. This would prove to be the first of many challenges Sullivan faced as a female in the largely male-dominated world of archaeology in the 1970s. However, in 1972 Congress passed the Equal Employment Opportunity Act prohibiting employment discrimination on basis of race, color, national origin, sex, religion, age, disability, political beliefs, or marital/family status. Following this legislation, Sullivan found work in the summer of 1973, a year prior to her graduation from the University of Tennessee with a Bachelor of Arts in Anthropology, on the Tellico Project, and was one of the first women at the University of Tennessee to receive a paid job in field archaeology. Subsequently, Sullivan worked on several cultural resource management projects in Tennessee, including the Phipps Bend Nuclear Project through the University of Alabama.

In addition, Sullivan worked at Cahokia in the summer and fall of 1974. This project to investigate the east palisade was funded by the National Science Foundation under the direction of Melvin L. Fowler. While at Cahokia, Sullivan was inspired by women PhD students in archaeology, the first that she had met.

In the summer of 1975, Sullivan was hired by the Archaeology Labs at the University of Wisconsin-Milwaukee to assist with analysis of a systematic surface collection from Ramey Field at Cahokia. In the fall of 1975, she enrolled in graduate school there. Lynne Goldstein served as her major professor. Sullivan received her Master of Science Degree in Anthropology and a Certificate in Museology in December 1977.

After a stint doing archaeological surveys for the Illinois Department of Transportation through the University of Illinois, Sullivan returned to the University of Wisconsin-Milwaukee for her doctoral work. She received a National Science Foundation Doctoral Dissertation Improvement Grant for her research on the Mouse Creek Phase, a Late Mississippian complex near her hometown of Cleveland TN. The most extensive excavations at three Mouse Creek phase sites took place during the 1930s by the University of Tennessee working in conjunction with the federal Works Progress Administration, a program initiated for the creation of jobs under the New Deal. The collections from these sites are curated at McClung Museum on the campus of Sullivan's undergraduate alma mater, the University of Tennessee. Sullivan received her doctorate in 1986 from the University of Wisconsin-Milwaukee.

== Post-graduate research history ==
While completing her dissertation, Sullivan worked for the Dickson Mounds branch of the Illinois State Museum and subsequently received a job with Southern Illinois University at Carbondale. While a doctoral student, she had previously worked for SIU as a project director for CRM projects. Sullivan was the University's first non-graduate to serve as curator of the Center for Archaeological Investigation's collections. Following her job at Southern Illinois, Sullivan became the first female Curator of Anthropology at the New York State Museum in Albany, New York. During her thirteen-year-long employment at that museum, Sullivan played a major role in the renovation and reorganization of the Museum's vast archaeological collections. She obtained two National Science Foundation Systematic Anthropological Collections grants to do the first comprehensive inventory and records organization of the 150-year-old archaeological collections, as well a national Native American Graves Protection and Repatriation Act grant to do the first ever inventory of the Museum's human osteology collections. She also began field schools at the Ripley site, a late prehistoric and proto-historic site in western New York which had been partially excavated by Arthur C. Parker in the early twentieth century. With colleagues Sarah and Phillip Neusius, she won National Science Foundation funding for that project. While in New York, Sullivan continued her main research interests in the Mississippian Period in eastern Tennessee. She obtained National Science Foundation funding for a pottery seriation project and began a small field school on the Hiwassee Island site with Appalachian State University and the University of Tennessee at Chattanooga. In 1999, Sullivan left her post in New York and returned to the site of her undergraduate education in order to take the Curator of Archaeology position at the University of Tennessee's McClung Museum. Sullivan has worked for the University of Tennessee for twelve years, performing duties both in her capacity as Curator of Archaeology and as Adjunct Professor of Anthropology. She is responsible for managing the museum's extensive collections, advising a small group of graduate students, and conducting her own research for publication. Additionally, she served as the first female editor of Southeastern Archaeology, the Southeastern Archaeological Conference's annual journal, as well as chair of the Society for American Archaeology's Committee on Museums, Collections, and Curation.

== Research projects ==
Sullivan's research encompasses a diverse body of work including subjects such as Southeastern prehistory, Mississippian chiefdom societies, mortuary analysis, curation and preservation, social inequality, gender roles, and history of archaeology. She has published seven books and numerous articles on these topics.

=== Mississippian chronology project ===
One of Sullivan's biggest projects has been a career-long undertaking to understand chronological and spatial variation during the Mississippian Period in eastern Tennessee. As of 2001, the accepted chronology for eastern Tennessee divides the Mississippian period into the Martin Farm (900-1100 AD), Hiwassee Island (1100-1300 AD), Dallas (1300–1600), and Mouse Creek (1400–1600) phases. The centuries–long duration of these phases prohibits meaningful interpretations of settlement patterning as well as variation and shifts in sociopolitical organization because it is not possible to determine which sites are contemporaneous. Sullivan, with her graduate students, has focused on obtaining high precision accelerator mass spectrometry (AMS) dates for sites excavated in the 1930s and for which no absolute dates had been obtained, as well as obtaining such dates for important sites for which there were only standard radiocarbon dates with large standard deviations. Recently, this work has interfaced with dendrochronological studies by Henri Grissino-Mayer which has incorporated samples made in the 1930s by Florence Hawley from living trees in the Norris Basin and from archaeological sites excavated by the WPA in several areas of eastern Tennessee. Sullivan has encouraged and assisted several graduate students to become interested in this project and they have produced relevant theses and dissertations. In addition to her research centered on Tennessee-based sites, Sullivan, with Timothy Pauketat, studied Cahokia's Mound 31 in order to establish the chronological placement of this mound. The mound appears to have been in use during Cahokia's late Lohmann/early Stirling phases (1050-1150 AD) and Morehead phase (1200-1275 AD). This temporal placement helps provide a better understanding for the chronological development of the Cahokia site and complex society during this time.

=== Gender/Feminist archaeology ===
One area of particular interest to Sullivan is that of the role of women in both prehistoric society and the development of modern archaeology. As a female working in a largely male-dominated field of study, Sullivan has faced prejudice throughout her career due to her gender. Inspired by women such as McClung Museum founder Madeleine Kneberg and dendrochronologist Florence Hawley, both of whom made vast contributions to Tennessee archaeology with very little recognition compared to their male colleagues, Sullivan has become a prominent proponent of the gender/feminist archaeology movement that developed in the 1970s as a faction of post-processual archaeological theory.

Her research on gender roles and social inequality overlaps with her studies on mortuary practices and sociopolitical hierarchy, and has helped provide a balanced perspective of Native American society.

=== WPA collections preservation project and curation ===
In examining the Mouse Creek phase data set for her dissertation, Sullivan noticed that large amounts of materials collected by the Works Progress Administration excavations during the 1930s had yet to be properly organized and examined. Sites from Tennessee Valley Authority Reservoir projects, such as Norris, Watts Bar, and the Chickamauga Basin, had no reports and the collections needed better curatorial conditions.

She took it upon herself to compile and complete the report for the Chickamauga Basin project and to get this important work published by the University of Tennessee Press. This project excavated many of the type sites for archaeological phases in eastern Tennessee. As Curator of Archaeology at the McClung Museum, Sullivan has made the preservation of the WPA collections one of her priorities. Working with the UT Libraries, she sought and received grant funding from the Institute of Museum and Library Services to create an online archive of the WPA-ers archaeological photos from the McClung Museum as well as the Alabama Museum of Natural History at the University of Alabama and the Webb Museum at the University of Kentucky. She also obtained funds from the federal Save America's Treasures program to rehouse the fragile and temporally diagnostic artifacts in the WPA collections into state-of-the-art museum cabinetry and to create an electronic inventory of these objects. Sullivan has also facilitated scanning of the WPA-era field records by student workers. These projects have both increased access to these document and artifacts as well as helped to preserve them for posterity. Additionally, Sullivan has encouraged the study of these collections by numerous graduate students at UT and elsewhere. In 2003, Sullivan published with S. Terry Childs a book entitled Curating Archaeological Collections: From the Field to the Repository, which was the first book devoted to archaeological curation issues in the United States.

== Bibliography ==
Sullivan's publications reflect the diversity of her research, and include subjects such as the prehistoric Southeastern U.S., the curation/preservation of artifact collections, mortuary analysis, and the role of women in the development of modern archaeology. Her seven books and a selection of her articles are listed below.

=== Books and monographs ===
- Mississippian Mortuary Practices: Beyond Hierarchy and the Representationist Perspective. (L.P. Sullivan & Robert C. Mainfort, Jr., eds.) 2009. University Press of Florida, Gainesville.
- Curating Archaeological Collections: From the Field to the Repository. (L.P. Sullivan & S. Terry Childs) 2003 Alta Mira Press, Walnut Creek, CA.
- Archaeology of the Appalachian Highlands. (L.P. Sullivan & Susan C. Prezzano, eds.) 2001. The University of Tennessee Press, Knoxville.
- Grit-Tempered: Early Women Archaeologists in the Southeastern United States.(Nancy M. White, L. P. Sullivan, & Rochelle Marrinan, eds.) 1999. Florida Museum of Natural History, Ripley P. Bullen Series, University Press of Florida, Gainesville.
- Ancient Earthen Enclosures of the Eastern Woodlands. (Robert C. Mainfort & L. P. Sullivan, eds.). 1998. Florida Museum of Natural History, Ripley P. Bullen Series, University Press of Florida, Gainesville.
- Reanalyzing the Ripley Site: Earthworks and Late Prehistory on the Lake Erie Plain.(L.P. Sullivan, ed.). 1996. New York State Museum Bulletin 489. The State Education Department, Albany.
- The Prehistory of the Chickamauga Basin in Tennessee (2 vols.).(L.P. Sullivan, ed.) 1995. The University of Tennessee Press, Knoxville.

=== Selected articles ===
- Reconfiguring the Chickamauga Basin (chapter 7), in New Deal Archaeology in Tennessee: Intellectual, Methodological, and Theoretical Contributions, edited by David H. Dye, University of Alabama Press 2016
- Residential Burial, Gender Roles, and Political Development in Late Prehistoric and Early Cherokee Cultures of the Southern Appalachians. (L.P. Sullivan & Christopher B. Rodning). 2010. In Residential Burial: A Multi-Regional Exploration, edited by Ron Adams & Stacie King, pp. 79–97. AP3A Series, American Anthropological Association. Washington DC
- Mississippian Mortuary Practices: The Quest for Interpretations. (L.P. Sullivan & Robert C. Mainfort, Jr.) 2009 In Mississippian Mortuary Practices: Beyond Hierarchy and the Representationist Perspective, L.P. Sullivan & Robert C. Mainfort, Jr., eds. University Press of Florida, Gainesville.
- Mortuary Practices and Cultural Identity at the Turn of the Sixteenth Century in Eastern Tennessee. (L.P. Sullivan & Michaelyn S. Harle) 2009. In Mississippian Mortuary Practices: Beyond Hierarchy and the Representationist Perspective, L.P. Sullivan & Robert C. Mainfort, Jr., eds. 2009. University Press of Florida, Gainesville.
- Archaeological Time Constructs and the Construction of the Hiwassee Island Mound. In 75 Years of TVA Archaeology, Erin Pritchard, ed. 2009 University of Tennessee Press.
- Differential Diagnosis of Cartilaginous Dysplasia and Probable Osgood-Schlatter's Disease in a Mississippian Individual from East Tennessee. (Elizabeth DiGangi, Jon Bethard, & L. P. Sullivan). 2009. International Journal of Osteoarchaeology.
- Hiwassee Island. 2008 in Archaeology in America: An Encyclopedia (four volumes), Francis P. McManamon, Linda S. Cordell, Kent G. Lightfoot, and George R. Milner, eds.. Greenwood Press, Westport, CT.
- A WPA Déjà Vu on Mississippian Architecture. 2007 In Architectural Variability in the Southeast: Comprehensive Case Studies of Mississippian Structures, pp. 117–135, Cameron H. Lacquement, ed. University of Alabama Press, Tuscaloosa.
- Cahokia's Mound 31: A Short-Term Occupation at a Long-Term Site. 2007Southeastern Archaeology 26(1):12-31. (L.P. Sullivan & Timothy R. Pauketat).
- L'archéologie de sauvetage à la Tennessee Valley Authority: une politique à long-terme. (Bailey Young & L. P. Sullivan) 2007 In L'archéologie reventive dans le monde: Apports d'archéologie reventive à la connaissance du passé, pp. 271–286. INRAP, Paris, France.
- Dating the Southeastern Ceremonial Complex in Eastern Tennessee. 2007 InSoutheastern Ceremonial Complex: Chronology, Iconography, and Style, Adam King, ed. pp. 88–106. University of Alabama Press.
- Case Study: Mouse Creek Phase Households and Communities: Mississippian Period Towns in Southeastern Tennessee. 2006 In Seeking Our Past: An Introduction to American Archaeology, Sarah W. Neusius & G. Timothy Gross, eds. Oxford University Press, New York
- Invisible Hands: Women in Bioarchaeology. (Mary Lucas Powell, Della Collins Cook, Georgieann Bogdan, Jane E. Buikstra, Mario M. Castro, Patrick D. Horne, David R. Hunt, Richard T. Koritzer, Sheila Ferraz Mendonça de Souza, Mary Kay Sandford, Laurie Saunders, Glaucia Aparecida Malerba Sene, L. P. Sullivan, John J. Swetnam) 2006 In A History of American Bioarchaeology: Peopling the Past, pp. 131–194, Jane E. Buikstra, ed. Elsevier Press, Burlington, MA.
- Gendered Contexts of Mississippian Leadership in Southern Appalachia. 2006 In Leadership and Polity in Mississippian Society, pp. 264–285, Paul Welch & Brian Butler, eds. Southern Illinois University Press, Carbondale.
