= Player preferences among new and old violins =

"Player preferences among new and old violins" is a scholarly paper published in the Proceedings of the National Academy of Sciences in January 2012. It describes a double-blind study in which researcher Claudia Fritz of the Pierre and Marie Curie University and violinmaker Joseph Curtin asked judges and participants at the 2010 International Violin Competition of Indianapolis to choose the violin they preferred from a pool of three modern violins, two Stradivariuses, and one Guarneri 'del Gesu'. Fritz and Curtin found that participants most frequently chose a new rather than old violin. This result—which contradicts widespread belief among violinists that the best 16th and 17th century Golden Age violins are superior to the best modern ones—attracted significant media attention.

== Experiment ==
Fritz and Curtin performed the experiment at the Eighth International Violin Competition of Indianapolis (IVCI), selecting participants for the experiment from the competitors and judges. They held the experiment in a dim room, with participants wearing welding goggles so they could not identify the instruments. Additionally, perfume placed on the violin chin rests prevented identification by smell.

The experiment involved three tests:

- Head-to-head challenge with 10 pairs (one old, one new) of violins: Each violin was played for one minute. The subjects were not told that the pairs contained one old and one new violin. Then, each subject judged the instruments in a pair on tonal color range, projection, playability, and response.
- Pick-one challenge: All six instruments were available to play, however desired, for 20 minutes, with the subject instructed to "pick one to take home."
- Concert challenge: Zachary DePue, the concertmaster of the violin competition, played the instruments on stage in front of the 1500 violin competition participants.

=== Violins tested ===
The experiment tested six violins—three old and three new. The old violins had a combined value of approximately $10,000,000 USD. This was roughly 100 times the value of the new violins.

The three new violins were each made by a different luthier and were from several days to several years old. "They were chosen from a pool of violins assembled by the authors, who then selected the three they felt (i) had the most impressive playing qualities and (ii) contrasted with each other in terms of character of sound."

The number of violins tested was small, due to time constraints and the difficulty of obtaining multimillion-dollar instruments to be played by blindfolded strangers.

==== Old violins ====
The older violins were loaned to the experiment by IVCI attendees, with the stipulation that the experimenters not modify the instruments in any way (strings, sound post placement, etc.), and not identify the lenders or individual violins.

| Designation | Description | Notes |
|---|---|---|
| O1 | Antonio Stradivari (c.1700) | "...once the principal instrument of a well-known 20th century violinist, and currently belongs to an institution that loans it to gifted violinists. It came to us from a soloist who had used it for numerous concerts and several commercial recordings in recent years." |
| O2 | Guarneri ‘del Gesu’ (c.1740) | "...from the maker’s late period, during which he made some of his most celebrated violins." |
| O3 | Antonio Stradivari (c.1715) | "...from the maker’s ‘Golden Period,’ and has been used by a number of well-known violinists for concerts and recordings." |

=== Players ===
Twenty one violin players were used as subjects in the experiment. Four subjects were contestants in the IVCI competition, two were jury members. The others were members of the Indianapolis Symphony. Two of the contestants were eventually selected by the IVCI competition as "competition laureates".

All of the players played all of the violins, using their own bow. Four of the subjects did not bring a bow and were provided a "high quality" bow by the experiment's organizers.

== Results ==
- The most-preferred violin was new.
- The least-preferred was by Stradivari.
- There was low correlation between instrument age and monetary value, and perceived quality.
- Most players couldn't tell whether the instrument they preferred was new or old.

13 of the 21 violinists preferred the new violins. Eight subjects chose an old violin to take home. The violinists could not reliably identify which instruments were old and which were new.

The study revealed that there was no statistical correlation between the age of an instrument and whether participants preferred it in the head-to-head competition.

== Criticism ==
Earl Carlyss of the Juilliard String Quartet criticized the study, saying its methods were inappropriate for evaluating instrument quality. He said that what makes the older violins better is how they sound to an audience in a concert hall, and that it is irrelevant whether a violinist prefers a certain violin in a hotel room. He felt the test was as valid as comparing a Ford and a Ferrari in a parking lot.

== Subject reactions ==
John Soloninka, one of the violinists who played in the study, said, "It was fascinating. I too, expected to be able to tell the difference, but could not," and that, "If, after this, you cling to picayune critiques and dismiss the study, then I think you are in denial. If 21 of us could not tell in controlled circumstances and 1500 people could not tell any differences in a hall, and this is consistent with past studies…then it is time to put the myths out to pasture."

Ariane Todes, editor of The Strad magazine and one of the participants in the study, reported "It's a stretch to get to the myth-busting generalisation that violinists can't tell a Strad from a modern instrument. There are too many philosophical issues and variables to be definitive about that. However, the data clusters around a popular modern instrument and an unpopular Stradivari force one to consider the preconceptions that are so hardwired. Although of course, here at The Strad, it comes as no surprise to us that modern instruments can sound fantastic."

Another participant, Laurie Niles, criticized the study's characterizations, stating that she wasn't asked to identify old vs. new violins, only to state her preferences. She also noted that the organizers adjusted the new violins, while the old violins were in whatever state the lender had them. She said, "I think we can conclude that, with a very limited amount of playing time and under circumstances that are a lot like those in a violin shop (a dry room, lots of testing), we are just as impressed with the tonality of great new instruments as with the tonality of great old ones." She added, "Honestly, I have no issue with the idea that a well-made modern can sound as good as an $8 million Strad. The moderns I played under these odd circumstances were just beautiful-sounding. The old Italians were, too. This is good news for us violinists, because virtually none of us can afford a multi-million dollar Strad."

== Other experiments ==
There have been many comparisons of Stradivarius and other old violins with more recent violins since 1817. They generally have found no differences in either subjective impressions or acoustic analysis. However, the tests have been criticized on various grounds. In a well-known 1977 experiment, Isaac Stern and Pinchas Zukerman and a classical violin dealer, Charles Beare, listened to a Stradivarius, a Guarneri, and a 1976 British violin. They were also unable to identify which instrument was which, and two of them mistakenly identified the 1976 violin as the Stradivarius.

== See also ==
- Stradivarius
- Double blind#Double-blind trials
- Judgment of Paris (wine)
- The Strad
