= Johannes Siegfried Finkel =

German-Swiss bow maker

Johannes Siegfried Finkel (1947) is a German born Swiss master bowmaker or bogenmacher.

== Biography ==
Johannes Siegfried Finkel was born in Markneukirchen in 1947 to Siegfried Finkel and Hanna Weidhaas. In 1952, he and his family moved to Schwanden, Switzerland. Like his grandfather, Paul Weidhaas, Johannes learnt his craft from his father and expanded his knowledge through several years of travel abroad, working in London for J & A Beare in London from 1968-1970. Then decided to move and work in Los Angeles for Hans Weisshaar, and later William Moennig & Son in Philadelphia. Returned to Brienz in 1974, with new ideas on bow making and restoration as well as networking. His meticulous workmanship and innovations earned him great international praise and respect among top ranked players, collectors and dealers.

Upon his father’s retirement in 1984, Johannes took over the family business. He became one of the foremost bow makers of his generation. He retired in 2013. His daughter Daniela Finkel (b.1987) – a fifth-generation bow maker, is now carrying on the family tradition (Finkel-Weidhaas dynasty).

== Bibliography ==
- Roda, Joseph (1959). Bows for Musical Instruments. Chicago: W. Lewis. OCLC 906667.
- Vannes, Rene (1985) [1951]. Dictionnaire Universel del Luthiers (vol.3). Bruxelles: Les Amis de la musique. OCLC 53749830.
- William, Henley (1969). Universal Dictionary of Violin & Bow Makers. Brighton; England: Amati. ISBN 0-901424-00-5.
- Deutsche Bogenmacher-German Bow Makers Klaus Grunke, Hans Karl Schmidt, Wolfgang Zunterer 2000
