= Period Piano Company =

The Period Piano Company was established in 1976 by David Winston. His original training was as a violin maker, having apprenticed to the German violin maker Hans Weisshaar. This was followed by working for the harpsichord maker William Dowd in Boston for an additional four years, before moving to the UK to work in the Adlam-Burnett workshops. He has been entrusted with the restoration of antique pianos of great historical importance, including the piano which was made for Beethoven by John Broadwood & Sons in 1817, Chopin's Pleyel from 1846, as well as instruments associated with Mendelssohn, and Liszt. Beethoven's Piano is part of the Collection of the Hungarian National Museum. Chopin's Pleyel is in the Cobbe Collection. Winston, the owner of the company, was granted a royal warrant as a "conservator and restorer of pianos to Her Majesty" in 2012.
