= Samuel Zygmuntowicz =

- Born: 24 November 1956; Philadelphia
- Occupation: Violinmaker
- Instrument: Violin

Samuel Zygmuntowicz (born 1956) is a contemporary luthier and is widely regarded as one of the finest violin makers of his generation. He began his instrument making training at age 13, and studied making and restoration under Peter Prier, Carl Becker and René Morel. Since 1985 he has been based in Brooklyn, New York. His early work demonstrates expert skill as a copyist of classic instruments. Later work includes personal models informed by intensive advanced research. Findings from this research have been published in numerous print and digital media. Zygmuntowicz is an active fiddler, playing with several folk music groups. His playing can be heard on the recordings Grand Picnic, and Jump When the Trumpets Blow.

Zygmuntowicz was born in Philadelphia to Jewish Holocaust survivors from Poland. He is a graduate of the Violin Making School of America in Salt Lake City (1976–80) during which time he also worked for Carl Becker. In 1980, a Becker-style Stradivari violin copy made by Zygmuntowicz won two gold medals - for violin workmanship and tone - at the Violin Society of America Competition. The same year, Zygmuntowicz began five years of additional training in the restoration workshop of Jacques Français Rare Violins, Inc. and René A. Morel. Isaac Stern owned two Zygmuntowicz violins. After Stern died in 2001, both violins were sold at a Tarisio auction in 2003, each violin surpassing the previous record for the highest price paid for a string instrument by a living maker at auction, until the record was broken in October 2013.

His clients include Leila Josefowicz, Yo-Yo Ma, David Finckel, Cho-Liang Lin, Maxim Vengerov, Joshua Bell, Dylana Jenson, Matthew Lipman and the Emerson String Quartet. In their 2008 recording of Bach fugues, the Emerson String Quartet all played Zygmuntowicz instruments. The Violinmaker, a book written by John Marchese, chronicles the making of a violin for Emerson String Quartet violinist Eugene Drucker.

== Strad3D ==
Since 2006, Zygmuntowicz has been the creative director of the Strad3D project, which The Strad Library called "One of the most groundbreaking and comprehensive studies of the violin form ever conceived." It involved the first 3D laser vibration scanning of Stradivari and Guarneri violins, (the 'Titian' and 'Willemotte' Stradivaris, and the 'Plowden' Guarneri 'del Gesu') and included acoustic testing and CT scanning. Zygmuntowicz turned the endeavor into a broad collaborative project, bringing together makers, musicians, filmmakers, acoustical engineers, and other researchers - among them physicist and co-developer George Bissinger, who had pioneered the use of vibration scanning using lasers.

According to Zygmuntowicz, "The instruments were gently activated by tapping the bridge, and then three scanning lasers detected the resulting patterns of vibration, which were revealed on screen as a rippling landscape of colour and motion, rather like a motion-capture animated film." The result was the first three-dimensional motion capture of violins in use. The practical value of these scientific investigations continues to emerge. Initial findings were published in an article appearing in the January 2009 issue of The Strad.

== Teaching, public speaking, and outreach ==
Zygmuntowicz is an active speaker at museums, conferences, chamber music festivals, and intensive workshops, on topics ranging from historical and contemporary violin-making techniques to modern violin acoustics and cutting-edge research.

Recent engagements include, The National Museum of Mathematics (MoMath) in 2016, Lake Champlain Chamber Music Festival of 2015-16, Music@Menlo Festival of 2017, The 2018 La Jolla SummerFest, Banff String Quartet Competition of 2013, The 2012 EG Conference, and yearly appearances at the Oberlin Acoustics Workshop, and at the Juilliard School in NY.

These presentations have been adapted to the various interests of the general public, active string players, scientific researchers, and experienced luthiers.

Videos of past presentations can be found on Zygmuntowicz’ Studio YouTube Channel, and videos from the Strad3D project on the Strad3D YouTube Channel.

Zygmuntowicz has published several analyses of great classic instruments, including the 'Duport' cello, 'Titian', and 'Huberman' violins of Stradivari, the 'Plowden' Guarneri 'del Gesu' violin, and a 1796 Mantegazza viola.
