= Emil Herrmann =

American luthier (1888–1968)

- Born: February 2, 1888; Tauberbischofsheim, Germany
- Died: September 5, 1968 (aged 80); Castagnola, Switzerland
- Other names: Emil Hermann
- Occupation: Luthier

Emil Herrmann (February 2, 1888 – September 5, 1968), also written as Emil Hermann, was a prominent dealer and restorer of violins in New York City. Nearly all of the most famous instruments passed through his hands at one time or another in his career, including literally hundreds made by Antonio Stradivari, Jacob Stainer, and the Amati and Guarneri families. He taught and employed later influential figures in the violin trade such as Simone Sacconi and Hans Weisshaar.

== Biography ==
Herrmann was born in Tauberbischofsheim, Germany, the son of August Herrmann, who was also a stringed instrument dealer. He played violin from boyhood, studying with Leopold Auer, Otakar Ševčík, and Eugène Ysaÿe. He began traveling as a dealer for his father's business when he was 18. He was in the German army during World War I and spent time as a prisoner of war in Dauriya. He opened his own violin shop in Berlin after the war and launched his first store in New York City in 1923. He maintained both shops and expanded to Chicago and San Francisco before 1929. After World War II, he moved his stock and his business to Easton, Connecticut.

Herrmann married the Russian Kira Yurkevich; their daughter Tatjana married the son of Igor Sikorsky. Herrmann became an American citizen in 1952. He died in Castagnola, Switzerland, in 1968, at the age of 80.
