= Molitor Stradivarius =

1697 violin

The Molitor Stradivarius is an antique violin made by Italian luthier Antonio Stradivari of Cremona in 1697, the very beginning of the maker's celebrated "Golden" period. It bears the label "Antonius Stradivarius Cremonensis / Faciebat Anno 1697" and is branded to the lower rib, "Curtis Phila."

Thought to have been owned by Napoleon Bonaparte, the violin belonged to 19th-century Parisian socialite and arts patron Juliette Récamier until 1804, when it came into the possession of a general in Napoleon's army, Count Gabriel Jean Joseph Molitor. The violin remained in the family of its namesake until World War I, when it was sold in quick succession by several Parisian firms. The violin then joined the ranks of other superlative instruments in the collection of the Curtis Institute of Music, where it remained before being sold by the London firm of William Hill in 1936.

In 1957 the violin was purchased by William Anderson of Derry, Northern Ireland, where it remained under his bed in Aberfoyle Terrace until 1988. When William died in 1988, his sister Muriel offered the violin to the Red Cross. The violin sold in London for £209,000 of which £195,000 went directly to the Red Cross.

The violin was purchased by American violinist Elmar Oliveira at Christie's in 1989.

Albert I. Stern owned the Molitor Stradivarius for 16 years, until 2010. The Molitor Stradivarius was sold through Tarisio Auctions on October 14, 2010, for a record $3.6 million, the highest auction price ever paid for any musical instrument until the Lady Blunt was sold at auction on June 20, 2011.

The current owner of the Molitor is American violinist Anne Akiko Meyers, who purchased the violin from Tarisio Auctions.

== See also ==
- Stradivarius
- List of Stradivarius instruments
