= Simone Fernando Sacconi =

Italian violin maker and restorer (1895 - 1973)

Simone Fernando Sacconi (May 30, 1895 in Rome – June 26, 1973 in Point Lookout) was an expert Italian violin maker and restorer who studied fellow luthier Antonio Stradivari extensively during his lifetime.

== Biography ==
"While still at school he became a workshop assistant to Giuseppe Rossi, a pupil of Degani. By the time he was 16, Sacconi already had his own clientele, and a particular ability as a maker of copies. In 1931 he moved to New York to work for the dealer Emil Herrmann. He continued to make new instruments – and occasionally bows – but his time there was mainly taken up with repairs and restoration work. In this field he had no equal, an example of his work being a Stradivari of the best period, virtually destroyed in an accident in 1948, which now shows no sign of having suffered. In the imitation of old Italian varnish he excelled all rivals.

In 1951, upon the invitation of Rembert Wurlitzer, Sacconi went with his pupil D’Attili to work for Rembert Wurlitzer Co. A first-class workshop was built up and many of the best American repairers were trained in it. In his last years he spent much time teaching in Cremona, Italy, and published I segreti di Stradivari (Cremona, 1972), setting out in detail Stradivari’s working methods." - Charles Beare

His constant experiments with varnish was almost an obsession. He was one of the principal organizers of the Stradivari Bicentennial Exhibition in Cremona in 1937. Sacconi won gold medal for a quartet of instruments. In 1972, he was bestowed honorary citizenship by Cremona (the highest honor).

In 2012, nine of Sacconi's medals were discovered shortly before they were due to be melted down. Of the medals, one was awarded to Sacconi by his pupils, and is engraved with their names; Segal, Esposti, Zambelli and Bissolotti. Also found was the medal awarded by the City of Cremona, medals marking the bicentennial of the death of Stradivarius, and two wartime medals, awarded for service during World War I.

Sacconi has directly influenced several generations of makers/restorers: Charles Beare, Max Moller, Pierre Vidoudez, Dario D'Attili, Hans Weisshaar, Jacques Francais, Frank Passa, Bernard Millant, Mario F. D'Alessandro, Harry Duffy, René Morel, William Salchow, Hans Nebel, Roland Feller,Vahakn Nigogosian, C. Ray Ferguson, Carlos Arcieri, David Segal, Carleen M. Hutchins, Francesco Bissolotti, William J. Huggler, Ronald J. Huggler, James Reynold Carlisle. Through his disciples (such as Jacques Francais / René Morel), he has influenced makers/restorers such as Samuel Zygmuntowicz, Horacio Piñeiro, Boris Sverdlik, Jerry Pasewicz, Bogaslaw Kieta, David T. Van Zandt, Andrew Dipper, James N. McKean, Christophe Landon, Richard Oppelt, Jonathan Woolston (UK) & from the shop of Hans Weisshaar came Otto Karl Schenk, David Burgess, Tom Wilder, Andreas Mages (Germany), Bruce Carlson (Italy), Wendy and Peter Moes to name a few.

Many celebrated musicians came to him for advice and entrusted him with their precious instruments when they needed attention. List includes Isaac Stern, Yehudi Menuhin, Salvatore Accardo, Pina Carmirelli, Pablo Casals, Paul Doktor, Pierre Fournier, Zino Francescatti, Joseph Fuchs, Raya Garbousova, Carlo Maria Giulini, Bruno Giuranna, Franco Gulli, Charles Libove, Erica Morini, André Navarra, Ruggiero Ricci, Leonard Rose, Toby Saks, Alexander Schneider, Janos Starker, Henryk Szeryng, Efrem Zimbalist, Felix Salmond, and Uto Ughi were just some of the top musicians who either purchased or had their treasured instruments maintained by him.

His main publication was 'I segreti di Stradivari', translated into many languages and sold worldwide.

"Simone Sacconi is recognized as one of the important contemporary violin makers. His book explains the construction techniques used by Stradivari with clarity and precision. It is considered an indispensable reference for both the professional and novice violin maker." - Eric Blot

"Sacconi was described as a "Hero of the art of violinmaking". - Andrea Mosconi

"Every detail absorbed his complete attention" - Carlos Arcieri

"Described by many expert artisans as an exalted beacon of contemporary restorers and conservators"

"....one of the greatest violin maker and restorers of our time, Simone Fernando Sacconi." - W. Zambelli https://www.violiniincremona.it/

Simone Fernando Sacconi in the testimony of Wanna Zambelli https://www.violiniincremona.it/articoli/zambelli-e-sacconi

"Fernando" was a man of many interests: He was a photographer, avid salt water fisherman, musician, small game hunter, mushroom researcher, and epicurean.
