= Siegfried Finkel =

Siegfried Finkel (1927-2010) was a German born Swiss master bowmaker or bogenmacher.

== Biography ==
Siegfried Finkel was born in Koningsberg in 1927. After WWII, he came to Markneukirchen to learn bow-making and apprenticed with Paul Weidhaas, who soon became his father-in-law. After completing his apprenticeship became Weidhaas's associate. Siegfried also met Weidhaas's daughter Hanna, fell in love, and married. Their son Johannes Siegfried Finkel was born in 1947. In 1952, Siegfried moved to Schwanden, Switzerland where he joined Brienz Bogen AG, which had been co-founded by Adolf König and Carl Willy Hoyer in 1947. After Hoyer's passing in 1955, Siegfried took over the firm, renaming it ‘Brienz Bogenwerkstätte AG’, which he managed very successfully until his retirement in 1984. At which point his son Johannes took charge of the family business and carried on the Weidhaas-Finkel dynasty.

Siegfried Finkel combined the best of French and German styles of bow making. He made many bows of superb quality during his lengthy career. Upon his retirement, he passed his workshop to his son, Johannes Siegfried Finkel. In his early career, he supplied bows to Wurlitzer’s in New York branded ‘REMBERT WURLITZER N.Y.’. Siegfried also supplied bows to Vidoudez of Geneva, Jacques Français, and Kenneth Warren.

The Finkel shop employed up to eight bow makers throughout Siegfried's tenure. They included Werner Ernst, Jac Flück, Jean Claude Ouchard, Christian Hans-Karl Schmidt and Rudolf Neudörfer. Siegfried Finkel was considered one of the outstanding makers of his day.

== Sources ==
- Lutgendorff, Willibald Leo (1922). Die Geigen und Lautenmacher vom Mittelalter bis zur Gegenwart. Frankfurt an Main: Frankfurter Verlags-Anstalt.
- Alberto Bachmann (1966). Encyclopedia of the Violin. Da Capo Press.
- Roda, Joseph (1959). Bows for Musical Instruments. Chicago: W. Lewis. OCLC 906667.
- Vannes, Rene (1985) [1951]. Dictionnaire Universel del Luthiers (vol.3). Bruxelles: Les Amis de la musique. OCLC 53749830.
- William, Henley (1969). Universal Dictionary of Violin & Bow Makers. Brighton; England: Amati. ISBN 0-901424-00-5.
- "Bow making – a family affair". www.finkel-bows.ch.
