= Benning Violins =

American luthier business

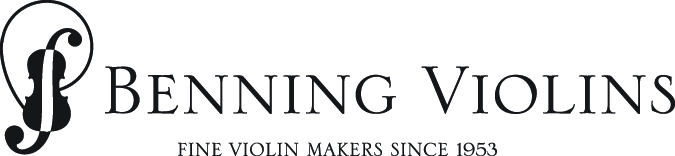

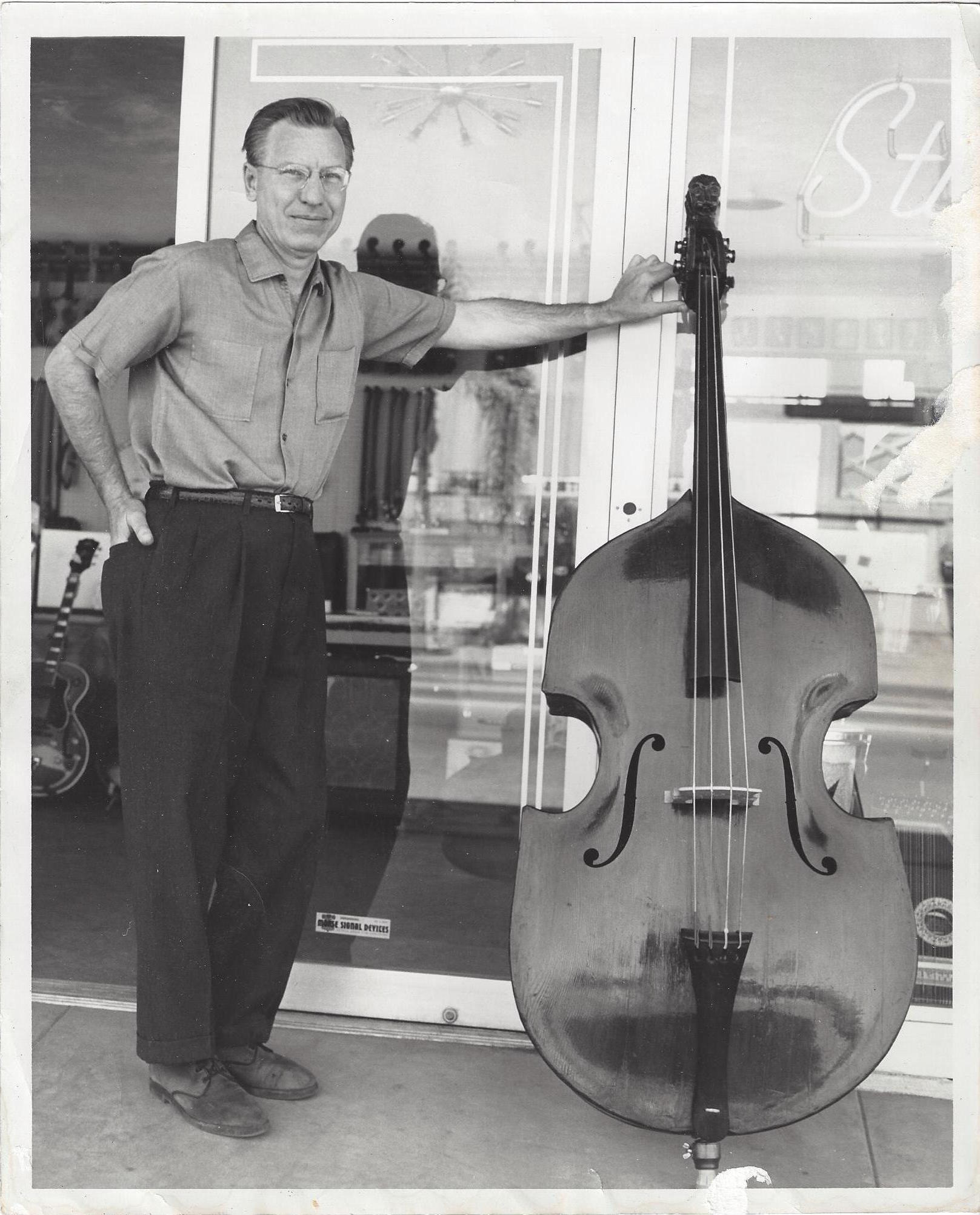
- Paul Toenniges with a double bass in front of Studio City Music, ca. 1963
- Company type: Luthier
- Founded: 1950
- Founder: Paul Toenniges
- Headquarters: Ventura Boulevard, Studio City, Los Angeles, US
- Products: Violins, violas, cellos
- Services: Craft, restoration, repair
- Owner: Eric Benning
- Website: Official website

Benning Violins is a California-based luthier business, crafting, restoring and repairing violins, violas and cellos since its opening in 1950 as Studio City Music. In 1953, it moved to its current location on Ventura Boulevard. Learning the craft from his brother-in-law, Carl Becker Sr., Paul Toenniges worked in William Lewis & Son in Chicago, and later under Rudolf Wurlitzer, finally opening his first studio in Los Angeles. Crafting up to five instruments a year, they sell for approximately $30,000-$42,000 apiece.

Nancy, one of founder Paul Toenniges' daughters, together with her husband, Hans Benning, took over the studio in 1978 after Paul's retirement. Nancy and Hans studied violin making at the Violinmaking School in Mittenwald. Luthier Eric Benning, Nancy and Hans' son who trained with celebrated maker Carl Fredrick Becker, currently runs the business, while his son Nathan also performs as a luthier.

Notable musicians who bought Benning instruments include Paul Coletti, Sid Weiss, Victor Gaskin (used while recording Duke Ellington's 70th Birthday Concert) and Arnold Jacobs, while Hans Benning restored and maintained several of Jascha Heifetz's instruments during the latter part of his life. Benning Violins also maintained some of Nathaniel Ayers' violins.

The Benning family has donated numerous instruments and taught students in Vicente Guerrero, Baja California. One of their students, Tito Quiroz, founded a music school in Ensenada named the Benning Academia de Musica. The Bennings have visited the academy in Ensenada about once a fortnight since 1978. Hans Benning and Quiroz also worked to build a music studio in an Ensenada prison, and conduct rehabilitation work at the Foundation For His Ministry mission in Baja California.

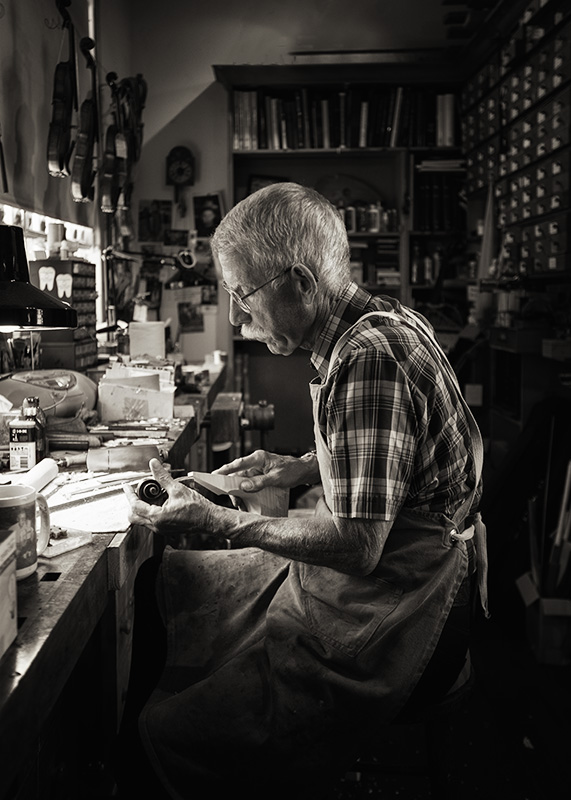
Hans Benning

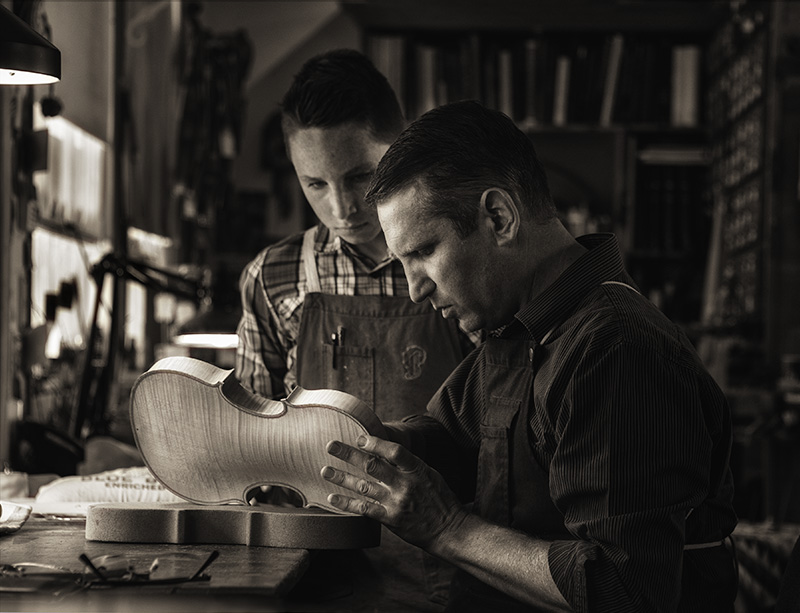
Nathan and Eric Benning

== Paul Toenniges ==
Its founder, Paul Toenniges, was born in De Kalb, Illinois to Frederic and Elizabeth Toenniges on December 18, 1908. After graduating from DeKalb High School in 1925, he moved to Chicago to work with Lewis & Son while living with Carl Becker, a prominent luthier.

In 1934, Toenniges married Ruth Breinstein. During WWII, Paul resorted to American curly birch, given European wood became unavailable. In 1946, he moved to LA together with his wife, and started working at the Wurlitzer Violin Collection, making instruments at home during his own time. Realising he wanted to dedicate to the restoration and sale of fine instruments, he set up shop in 1953. At the time, he sold all types of instruments, involving his two daughters in the business by 1956, Nancy in particular.

== Hans and Nancy Benning ==
Nancy attended the renowned violin making school in Mittenwald, where she met her future husband. They ran the studio since the late 1970s until recently.
