= Tarisio Auctions =

Online auction house

Tarisio's New York gallery

Tarisio is the world's largest seller of fine stringed instruments and bows. Founded in 1999 as an auction house that specializes in string instruments and bows, Tarisio now has locations in New York, London and Berlin and serves a global clientele.

== Locations ==
Tarisio's New York offices and gallery are at 244–250 W 54th Street, in the former workshop of the prominent French violin dealer and restorer Jacques Français. Français was joined in 1964 by the luthier René A. Morel, also a Frenchman, who later opened his own shop in the same space. Morel continued to work in collaboration with Tarisio until the summer of 2011, offering soundpost adjustments and other expert services. After Morel's retirement, he was succeeded at Tarisio by his colleague the luthier Stefan Valcuha, who restores lutes as well as taking care of their general maintenance.

The London offices and showroom of Tarisio Europe are located at 86-87 Wimpole Street, just around the corner from the Wigmore Hall.

The Berlin offices are on Kurfürstendamm at the corner of Fasanenstrasse.

== History ==
Founded in 1999 by partners Christopher Reuning, Dmitry Gindin, and Jason Price, Tarisio was the world's first auction house to specialize in fine string instruments and bows. The firm held its first online auction in November 1999 and by October of that year British string magazine The Strad declared it a "major player" in the string instrument auction world, suggesting that "Sotheby's now regards Tarisio as its principal rival." According to The Red Book catalogue of auction results, the company set over 400 international auction records in its first 10 years of business.

In May 2003 the firm auctioned the private collection of acclaimed violinist Isaac Stern, which grossed $2.3 million, at the time the second-highest total for a violin auction. In July 2006 the firm announced its expansion with the addition of a London office to increase its presence in the European market. Jason Price became the sole owner of the firm in January 2010. In June 2010 Tarisio auctioned the contents of the historic Philadelphia violin firm of William Moennig & Son. The sale, which included over 600 lots of instruments, bows, and historical photographs, sold 100 percent of lots. The October 2010 auction, which included the 1697 Molitor Stradivarius, was, at the time, the highest-grossing violin auction in history, with over $9 million in sales.

In September 2012 the company announced its acquisition of Cozio, the world's largest online archive of musical instruments. The Cozio archive includes photographs, price histories, and provenance for over 50,000 instruments and bows, including results from auction houses worldwide. The site will continue to operate independently from Tarisio.

Tarisio introduced two features to reduce buyer's premiums and encourage early bidding. The first, implemented in October 2013, is First In, Last Out, in which someone who bids both first and last on a lot pays a reduced buyer’s premium of 18% up to and including $200,000 (£100,000) and 13% thereafter. The other is Buy Now, introduced in October 2014, which lets buyers purchase select lots instantaneously at a fixed price in advance of the bidding, and reduces premiums to 18% and 13% respectively, introduced in .

== Notable sales ==
The following is a list of notable instruments and bows sold by Tarisio. All prices are in $US and include the buyer's premium.

- After the death of American violinist Isaac Stern in 2001, his estate decided to sell his entire collection of instruments, bows, and musical ephemera through Tarisio. Among world record prices in the May 2003 sale was $130,000 paid for a modern copy of one of Stern's Guarneri violins by Brooklyn maker Samuel Zygmuntowicz.
- Two François Xavier Tourte cello bows Tarisio auctioned in October 2006 and February 2007 sold for then world record prices: the first for $196,000 and the second ("ex-Romberg") for £101,000 ($202,000). In the 20th century they were owned by Edmund Kurtz, principal cellist of the Chicago Symphony Orchestra.
- In October 2009, Tarisio auctioned a 1648 Nicolo Amati violin previously owned by Hollywood musical director George E. Stoll, a violin prodigy in his youth. The violin sold for $620,000, then a record for a Nicolo Amati at auction.
- Also sold in the October 2009 auction was a Jean-Baptiste Vuillaume violin made c. 1860, which fetched a record $210,000.
- In June 2010 Tarisio auctioned the contents of the Philadelphia violin firm of William Moennig & Son. Among the many fine bows in the sale was a François Nicolas Voirin "picture" viola bow, which featured a lens embedded in the frog bearing a photograph of J.B. Vuillaume. The bow sold for $27,600.
- Highlights in the April 2010 sale included a Joseph Alfred Lamy violin bow that sold for $54,000.
- The October 2010 sale, in addition to setting a new world record of $9.4 million for a musical instrument auction, included an 1892 Vincenzo Postiglione violin that sold for a record $126,000 and a Nicolas Maline violin bow, which fetched $36,000.
- The star lot of the October 2010 auction was the 1697 "Molitor" Stradivarius, previously owned by Albert Stern, which sold for a record $3.6 million to American concert violinist Anne Akiko Myers.
- After enthusiastic bidding, the 1721 Lady Blunt Stradivarius violin sold in the June 20, 2011 auction for a record $15.9 million. Sold on behalf of the Nippon Music Foundation of Japan, the violin's proceeds benefited the Nippon Foundation's Northeastern Japan Earthquake and Tsunami Relief Fund.
- Maestro Lorin Maazel's Guadagnini of 1783 sold in October 2011 for $1.8 million, doubling the previous world record for a Guadagnini violin sold at auction. The sale featured on the front cover of Strings Magazine as 'The Million Dollar Guadagnini'.
- The 'Primrose' Guarneri viola of 1697, formerly belonging to Scottish violist William Primrose sold for over $4 million, the highest price paid for a Guarneri family instrument at auction and the highest publicly recorded price for a viola of any type.
- Celebrated pedagogue Dorothy DeLay's Guadagnini of 1778, previously owned by Albert Stern, set a further world record for a Guadagnini when it was auctioned in October 2013 for $1.39 million.
- In December 2013, Tarisio sold a 1696 Stradivarius violin to Andrew Bernardi, the English violinist and leader of a British Music Festival. The Stradivarius had been stolen from violinist Min-Jin Kym in London's Euston Station in 2010 and later recovered in excellent condition. The violin sold for $2.3 million.
- Another world record was set at Tarisio's October 2013 sale of a violin by contemporary makers Gregg T. Alf and Joseph Curtin which had been commissioned by Ruggiero Ricci in 1985. The violin was a Curtin & Alf replica of the 1734 Ex-Huberman Guarneri del Gesù which Mr. Ricci used extensively in the last part of his concert career. The sale price of $132,000 was the highest price ever paid at auction for a violin by living makers.
- The June 2022 sale of the 1714 'da Vinci, ex-Seidel' Stradivari achieved USD $15.34 million (£12.29 million) in their New York auction. The violin was played for nearly 40 years by Toscha Seidel and retains its original parts and remains in pristine condition.
