= Emmanuel Gradoux-Matt =

- Born: August 1, 1961 (age 65); Germany
- Occupation: Artist
- Instruments: Violin, viola, cello

Emmanuel Gradoux-Matt is a French luthier, and the CEO and founder of Gradoux-Matt Rare Violins, LLC. He serves on the board of the Long Island Conservatory of Music and the Heifetz International Music Institute and holds offices in the American Federation of Violin and Bow Makers and the Violin Society of America.

== Early life ==
Emmanuel Gradoux-Matt was born in Germany, from a French family and raised alongside his two brothers in Switzerland.

== Professional life ==
Gradoux-Matt was schooled in the methods of violin-making in both Europe and the United States. Gradoux-Matt graduated first in his class with distinction from the Newark Violin Making School, which is part of the Nottingham Technical College. His experience in various ateliers includes Pierre Gerber in Lausanne, Switzerland, whom Gradoux-Matt credits as the most prominent influence on developing his early interest in the artistic, social, and musical aspects of violin-making. Gradoux-Matt also worked with W.E. Hill & Sons in Great Missenden, England, and with Jacques Francais in New York. Shortly after the establishment of René A. Morel Rare Violins, Gradoux-Matt became partner to René A. Morel and worked as Vice President of Morel & Gradoux-Matt, Inc. for over 13 years. In 2008, the pair parted ways. Later, Gradoux-Matt founded Gradoux-Matt Rare Violins LLC, and WMP Concert Hall at the new location of 31 East 28th Street in New York.

For over 30 years, Gradoux-Matt has developed new methods of restoration and repair. He often restores and cares for the world's most famous instruments, made by masters like Antonio Stradivari and Giuseppe Guarneri. In addition, Gradoux-Matt does sound adjustments for some of the world's most distinguished soloists, ensemble, and orchestra players. Some of his most universally applauded clients include Yo-Yo Ma and Joshua Bell.

He has given lectures at the Juilliard School of Music in New York City in the class of Joel Smirnoff.

As of October 2013, Gradoux-Matt is semi retired. And pursuing different interests. He spends part of his time building instruments. One of his celli was purchased in early 2013 by a member of the New York Philharmonic. He provides regularly expertise and valuations on rare instruments as well as advice on repairs and sound adjustments for his long term clients. He is the CEO and owner of Gostrings LLC and CEO of One to One Services LLC. He is pursuing his long and successful career as an artist. His paintings have been exhibited in many galleries in the USA. In Seattle, in Albuquerque and Chicago. He is a member of the National Arts Club of New York city. He is working as a film producer and consultant, in late 2018 as a co producer, co writer with Nishchaya Geira, and composer for the upcoming movie, "The Cross". A movie about the relationship of the catholic church and homosexuality.

== WMP Concert Hall ==
Gradoux-Matt founded the non-for-profit Workshop for Music Performance, or WMP Concert Hall, in New York in 2008. The hall is an elegant and quaint space that seats 70 and where most Wednesdays at 12:30 p.m., there are hour-long concerts called "Strad for Lunch" during which young and exceptionally gifted musicians play classical music on some of the best instruments Gradoux-Matt Rare Violins LLC has to offer. WMP Concert Hall closed its doors in 2013.
