= Albert Stern (violinist) =

American violinist

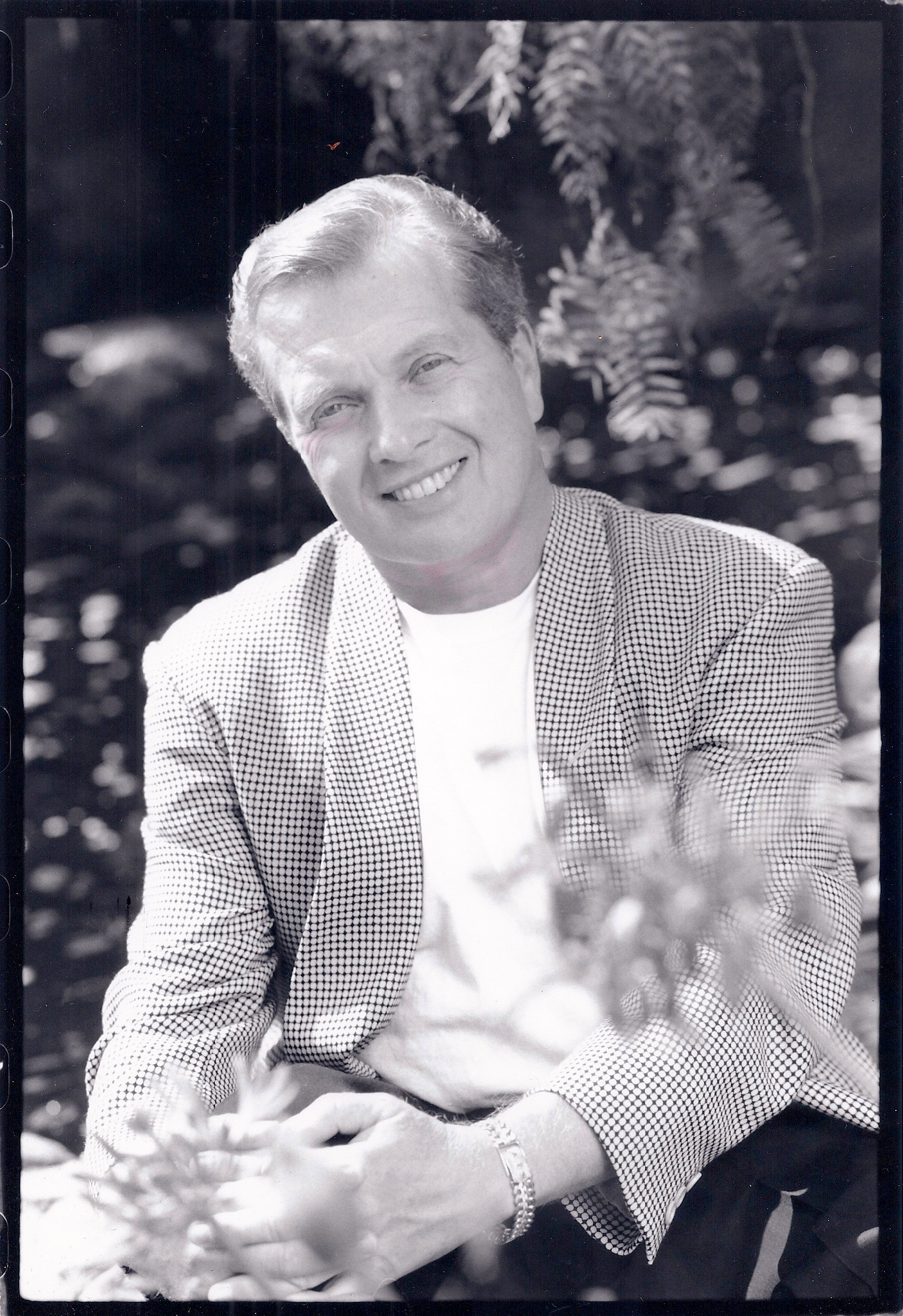
Stern in Malibu, California, 2013

Albert Ivan Stern (January 19, 1936 - August 22, 2024) was a violinist born in New York City.

== Early life ==
Stern's parents, father Murray Abraham Shmulevitch and mother Grace Sara Stern (née Gold), were both Jewish and born in Poland. Grace Gold immigrated to the U.S. as a child, and Murray immigrated later after graduating from the University of Berlin as a Doctor of medicine. After arriving in the U.S., Murray entered a lifelong career in business sales and, following in the footsteps of his father, became a prominent builder. Both his mother and father came from families of predominantly musicians. He had an older brother Stanley Stern (later known as Jack Stern), and an older sister, Florence London. Stern has four children, daughters Adina T. Stern, a prominent attorney, Aura L. Stern, a financier, and Shereen A. Stern, a nurse, and a son, Shawn Stern, a novelist. He is married to Patricia A. Stern (née Trzaska).

Stern first started learning to play the violin at the age of five when his father brought home a tiny violin and bow. Soon after picking it up, he was able to draw some clear notes. His father stated, "You are going to be a violinist." When he was 11, his parents moved to Los Angeles, where he studied at the Los Angeles Conservatory with Sascha Jacobsen, concertmaster of the Los Angeles Philharmonic. He then studied briefly with a student of Otakar Ševčík prior to studying with Noumi Fischer in Los Angeles until the age of 15. While studying with Fischer, he won many music contests and gave concerts appearing as a soloist with the Long Beach Symphony Orchestra and Los Angeles Philharmonic.

Stern entered and won the Young Artists television competition with judges Toscha Seidel and Marina Koshetz. At 16, he auditioned at the Juilliard School, where he was admitted and studied violin with Ivan Galamian and Dorothy DeLay. At Juilliard, Stern also studied with Louis Persinger for sonata classes, William Primrose for viola, Robert Mann for quartet classes, and Hans Letz. Stern had a bit part as a roaming musician in the 1964 film Kisses for My President.

== Violinist/Musician/Teacher ==
Stern's primary vocation is as a concert violin soloist and violin teacher. Stern has concertized as a soloist in recital and appearing with orchestras across the nation, receiving critical acclaim from audiences and critics alike. Los Angeles Times music critic Martin Bernheimer called Stern's performance "dazzling" after a concert, attended by over 6,000 people, of the West Coast Premier of Paul McCartney's Liverpool Oratorio, conducted by William Hall. The Performance, with Stern as violin soloist., was held at The Orange County Performing Arts Center and featured the Master Chorale of Orange County, the Master Chorale Orchestra and the Boys of the Costa Mesa children's Chorus.

=== Recordings ===
Stern recorded two albums performing on the 1697 'Molitor Stradivarius.' The first album, 'The Road to Love," is a collection of popular songs performed with the London City Symphony and recorded at Abbey Road Studios, London, conducted by Alan Williams.

The second, "The Road to Love II: Classic Embrace", features Stern's interpretations of works by Bach, Beethoven, Shubert, Sarasate, Saint-Saens, Puccini, Tchaikowsky and Wieniawski. "The Road to Love II" is one of the first albums ever recorded using full 24-bit technology from start through the mastering process. Stern is accompanied by Joanne Pierce Martin, performing on a 9'6" Imperial Bösendorfer concert grand piano.

=== Teaching ===
While at Juilliard and Meadowmount (Ivan Galamian's summer school) he was an assistant violin teacher to Dorothy DeLay. He conducted violin classes at Mount Saint Mary's College in Los Angeles where he served as Assistant Dean of Music and the concert master of the college's symphony orchestra in the early 1970s.

=== Fine Violins ===
Stern has owned many fine instruments, including the 1697 Molitor Stradivarius. Stern owned the "Lady Stretton" Giuseppe Guarneri del Gesú of 1726 that was featured at the 1994 del Gesú exhibition at the Metropolitan museum in New York. In 1994, Stern exchanged the "Lady Stretton" Guarneri for the "Molitor" Stradivarius with Elmar Oliveira.

Stern owned the Molitor Stradivarius from 1994 to 2010, during which time he recorded two albums with it for the record label RdA Music. The Molitor Stradivarius was sold through Tarisio Auctions on October 14, 2010 for a record $3.6 million, the highest auction price ever paid for any musical instrument until the Lady Blunt was sold at auction on June 20, 2011.

Stern also owned and performed on the 1778 Turin Guadagnini owned by his former mentor Dorothy DeLay. The DeLay Guadagnini sold at Tarisio Auction for $1.3 million in October 2013, setting a further world record for Guadagnini violins. This instrument is a strong example of late-Turin Guadagninis, featuring a low, flat arch emphasized by wide edges, broad corners and thick red varnish. These characteristics were Guadagnini's response to encouragement from his former patron, Count Cozio, to work in the style of Stradivari.

== Inventor ==
=== Donal Horse Perfector ===
Stern invented and patented a bitless bridle called the Donal Horse Perfector that was even sold behind the Iron Curtain in Russia during the cold war. The invention is designed to operate primarily by the application of nerve pressures rather than the physical force.

In traditional halter or hackamore type bridles, as well as the bit type of bridle, horse control is achieved through the use of physically applied forces which constrain the movement of the horse's head. The Donal Horse Perfector is designed with a contoured noseband so that its upper portion is kept in intimate contact with the face contiguous with the nasal nerve, and so that its lower portion will be in intimate contact with the lower jaw contiguous with certain of the mandibular nerves. This design allows an increase in the efficiency of the animal's response while requiring less physical force to achieve desired control.

=== AcoustaGrip ===
As a longtime owner of fine instruments, Stern developed a line of devices to aid violinists, violists and cellists under the name AcoustaGrip. AcoustaGrip products include shoulder rests for the violin & viola and pads for cellists. They are designed along the lines of stringed instruments and replicate those forms.

AcoustaGrip products use unique types of foam that have acoustical and memory properties. They attach to the instrument using a thin layer of micro air pockets. AcoustaGrip products are ergonomically contoured for added comfort and they are reported by musicians to enhance the sound of instruments.

== Horseman/Breeder ==
Under the pen name Ross Hunter, he authored a Horseman's Training Manual in 1969 covering a wide range of topics, including: Conformation, History, Donal Adjustment & Fit, Halter Breaking, Leading, Sacking Out (Bombproofing), Longeing, Trailer Breaking, Raining, Backing, Barrel Racing, Roping, English Adaptation, Polo, Flexion & Collection, Gymkhana, Jumping Trail Riding, Sliding Stops, Horse Psychology, Grooming, General Care & Feeding. Stern also wrote a series of articles for American Horseman magazine, under the pen name Ross Hunter, advocating humane horse training.

Stern began breeding Racing Quarter Horses at Stern Ranches Ltd in 1977. Stern is featured in Elizabeth Kaye McCall's book "The Tao of Horses: Exploring How Horses Guide Us On Our Spiritual Path." Over the years, Stern has owned and/or bred several stakes winning racehorses, including: Determined Dash Chivalry SR, Serenity Dash & others. On July 30, 2011, Chivalry SR won the 400-yard Spencer Childers California Breeders Championship Handicap, setting a track record of :19.067. The Stern Ranch is featured in Doug Van Gorder's Memoir "Hitchhiking Across America".
