= Marcel Fétique =

French bow maker

Marcel Gaston Fétique (born 1899 in Mirecourt – died 1977 in Paris) was a French archetier from a family of bowmakers.

Son of Victor Fétique (1872-1933), the family moved to Paris when he was two years of age. He apprenticed with his father in his father's shop along with other makers such as his uncle Jules Fétique, Thomassin, Toussain, Louis Morizot (1874-1957), Paul Weidhaas (1894–1962) and his cousin André Richaume. He stamped his bows 'Mcel Fetique a Paris' at the butt of the bow.

His grandfather was Charles Claude Fétique (1853-1911) who was a violin maker, who had two bow-making sons, Victor Fétique (1872-1933) and Jules Fétique (1875-1951), and a daughter Marie Augustine Marthe Fétique (1879-1928 Andre's mother). Marcel's cousin André Richaume (1905 - 1966) became one of the great French bow makers of the 20th century. His early work is very close to his father's (at times it is difficult to tell them apart). Later, was inspired by Émile Auguste Ouchard. Marcel's work is well respected.
