= René A. Morel =

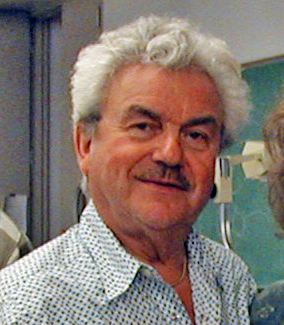
- René A. Morel in 2004

Background information
- Born: 11 March 1932; France
- Died: 16 November 2011 (aged 79) United States
- Occupation: luthier
- Instrument: Violin

René A. Morel (11 March 1932 – 16 November 2011) was an experienced and influential luthier who was highly regarded by leading international string players, who had been described as "arguably the best violin restorer in the world". He served on the juries of many violin-making competitions, and held offices in both the International Society of Violin and Bow Makers (Entente) as well as the American Federation of Violin and Bow Makers.

== Early life ==
Morel was born in France. Morel's grandfather, Paul Mangenot, was an instrument maker. As a result, Morel began gaining experience in workshops from the age of 12. He worked for Amédée Dieudonne in Mirecourt, Marius Didier, and Bossard Bonnel in Rennes. Finally, Morel returned to Mirecourt where he repaired violins until the age of 18.

Morel completed service in the French Air Force, and then moved to America where he worked for Kagan & Gaines in Chicago.

== Mid-life ==
In 1955, Morel began work at Rembert Wurlitzer's shop in New York, the leading instrument dealer in the city that is one of the largest centers for string players in the world, helping Morel build his reputation among top musicians. Simone F. Sacconi ran the shop and taught Morel many new concepts about violin restoration.

In 1964, Morel opened his own shop at Jacques Français, Rare Violins, Inc. in New York. Using French techniques of tool handling and ideas learned with Sacconi, Morel had now been developing new methods of restoration and repair for over 30 years. Morel's advancements further improved the quality and acoustics of viols. Many virtuoso string players sought out Morel specifically for sound adjustment in their instruments.

== Later life ==
On February 1, 1994, he opened René A. Morel Rare Violins in the same location, expanding his expertise to include dealing. In 1999, Morel & Gradoux-Matt, Inc. was started to make room for another experienced luthier, Emmanuel Gradoux-Matt. In 2008, Morel and Gradoux-Matt split, with Morel remaining at the same location, now within Tarisio Auctions on 54th Street.

Morel lived in Rutherford, New Jersey. He died of cancer at the age of 79 on November 16, 2011, in Wayne, New Jersey, and was survived by his companion, Christa Nagy, and his three children.

== Hobbies ==
"When he is not cutting wood for violins, René keeps fit by landscaping at his home far away from the city in Liberty, New York. He enjoys being close to the earth, horticulture and gardening occupy his free time. M. Morel also pursues hunting when he is not otherwise engaged...A bon vivant, M. Morel hopes to retire someday to his own vineyard, but in the meantime his favorite wines can be purchased through the Sherry-Lehmann catalogue." When he entertains in the city, he frequents René Pujol, Restaurant Français, La Côte Basque, and Les Sans Culottes.
