= André Richaume =

French bow maker / archetier (1905 - 1966)

André Georges Richaume (8 February 1905 in Mirecourt – 31 March 1966 in Paris) was a prominent French bowmaker, from a family of bowmakers.

His grandfather was Charles Claude Fétique (1853–1911), who was a violin maker, and who had two bow-making sons, Victor François Fétique (1872–1933) and Jules Fétique (1875–1951), and a daughter Marie Augustine Marthe Fétique (1879–1928 André's mother). André's cousin, Marcel Fétique (1899–1977 son of Victor), became a bowmaker as well.

Richaume apprenticed with Émile François Ouchard in Mirecourt, before joining his uncle Victor Fétique in 1927 in Paris. He established his own shop in the middle of 1930 and worked until 1966. In 1955 Richaume was awarded the distinction of "Meilleur Ouvrier de France" (one of the best craftsmen in France).

He supplied fine bows to other Parisian makers under his own brand. His work is very much influenced by Ouchard and his uncle Victor Fétique.

David Oistrakh used a Richaume bow in the later part of his life. Oistrakh had remarked that this bow gave him great satisfaction, so much so that when in Paris, he had to go meet Richaume in person. "The bow bought by his son Igor Oistrakh in 1957, had filled David with such enthusiasm that Igor made a gift of it."

== Quotes ==
"One of the great French bow makers of the 20th century". Christopher Brown

"One of the most remarkable bow makers of his generation".

"Superb maker in the finest tradition, whose work shows the influence of Ouchard and Fétique. It is said that his best bows are from his mature period especially those mounted in gold." Gennady Filimonov
