= Lady Blunt Stradivarius =

Stradivarius violin made in 1721

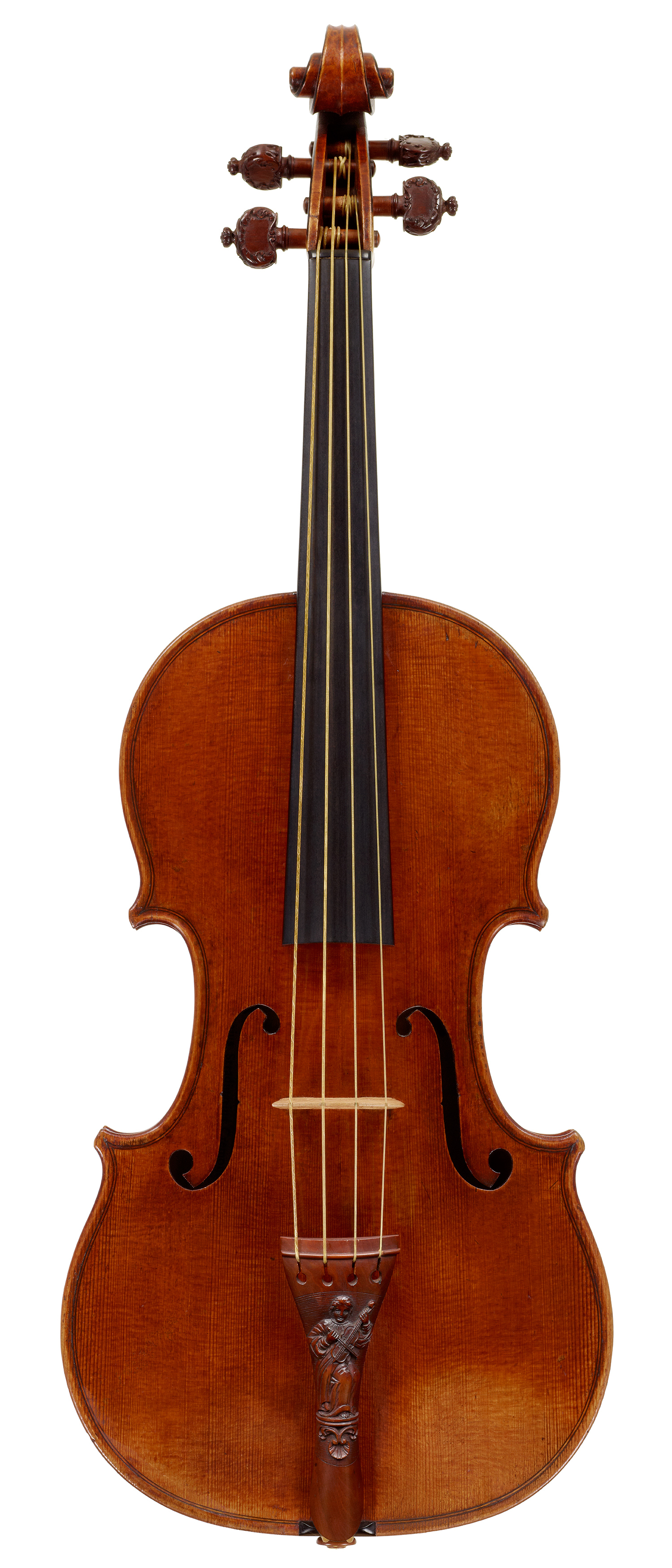
The 1721 Lady Blunt

The Lady Blunt is a Stradivarius violin made in 1721 by the renowned Italian luthier Antonio Stradivari. It is named after one of its first known owners, Lady Anne Blunt, the British co-founder of the Crabbet Arabian Stud.

== Ownership ==
The first owner of record was Jean Baptiste Vuillaume, an award-winning luthier, who found the violin in Spain in the 1860s. He sold the instrument to Lady Anne Blunt, the daughter of Ada Lovelace and granddaughter of Lord Byron. In the 1890s, W.E. Hill & Sons bought the violin from her and sold it to an important collector.

It was sold at a Sotheby's auction in 1971 for the then-record amount of £84,000 (US$200,000) by Robert Lowe, who owned the violin for nearly 30 years.

It was sold again at Sotheby's in London on 14 November 1985 for a record price of £820,000 to a private collector.

In 2008 it was sold to the Nippon Music Foundation for over US$10 million in a private transaction.

In the wake of the 2011 Tōhoku earthquake and tsunami, the Lady Blunt was put up for charitable sale, with proceeds going to the Nippon Foundation's relief fund. Tarisio Auctions handled the sale online, raising almost £10 million (US$15.9 million), more than four times the previous auction record for a Stradivarius, set by the sale of the Molitor for US$3.6 million in 2010. The anonymous buyer won a 90-minute bidding battle with one other bidder.

== Instrument ==
The Lady Blunt is one of the two best-preserved Stradivarius violins in existence. It has survived, unlike the modified Messiah Stradivarius of 1716 (which had its original baroque neck removed and replaced with modern neck), in near-original condition, since it has resided mostly in the hands of collectors and seen little use. It was built on the PG form, being a mature golden period violin. The violin also retains its original neck. It has been played very rarely; Yehudi Menuhin played it in 1971, when the instrument was up for sale. In 2011 it was described as "the best-preserved Stradivarius to be offered for sale in the past century."

== See also ==
- List of Stradivarius instruments
