= Henri Grissino-Mayer =

Henri Grissino-Mayer was a tenured faculty member in the department of Geography at the University of Tennessee, Knoxville who resigned in lieu of termination on Oct. 1st, 2018 due to his own admission of sexual misconduct at the school.

== Contributions ==
Grissino-Mayer is a dendrochronologist who specializes in the use of tree-ring analysis to reconstruct environmental and cultural history. He received a BS (with honors) in Geography in 1985 and an MA in Geography in 1988 from the University of Georgia. His thesis research directed by David Butler (now at Texas State University, San Marcos) investigated the relationships between climate and growth of shortleaf pine in north-central Georgia. He completed his Ph.D. under Tom Swetnam in the Laboratory of Tree-Ring Research at the University of Arizona in 1995. His dissertation research was conducted at El Malpais National Monument in New Mexico where he reconstructed precipitation and wildfire activity for the last 2,000 years. Grissino-Mayer has published over 90 peer-reviewed articles during his career. His work has appeared in journals such as Ecology, Holocene, International Journal of Wildland Fire, and Journal of Archaeological Science and has been featured on the Discovery Channel, the History Channel, and the Weather Channel.

== Accusations of sexual harassment ==
Accusations against Grissino-Mayer dated back to the mid 2000s and as of 2018 were widely reported. His case is one of a number on U.S. campuses in which senior academics have been accused of using their position to legitimate or conceal sexual behavior involving students.

On August 7, 2018, a formal complaint of sexual harassment was filed and the University of Tennessee launched the third investigation into Grissino-Mayer’s alleged inappropriate behavior and sexual misconduct involving students after previous investigations in 2006 and 2011. A reprimand decided in 2006 was either not issued or misfiled and added to his personnel file only in 2011. The 2018 investigation stated that Grissino-Mayer, through “abuse of his power and position as a tenured full professor with an active research program, a well-funded laboratory and a steady pipeline of high-achieving graduate students, had inappropriate relationships with current and former students, including inappropriate sexual relationships.”

On August 10, 2018, Grissino-Mayer met with several faculty members, where he admitted that he “not only violated the university’s policy,” but also that he “knew” and understood that “he was violating the policy at the time of his misconduct.” Grissino-Mayer would only admit that he violated policy in relation to the initial complaint but within a couple of days following that complaint a packet containing multiple other complaints was received by the Title IX office, suggesting his misconduct spanned most of his career.

On August 31, 2018, he voluntarily tendered a written resignation, effective October 1, 2018. Provost David Manderscheid called Grissino-Mayer's actions "so egregious, many of us have struggled with whether the university should accept his resignation. After careful review of the competing concerns, I concluded that the most compelling interests are those of his current and former students." The university accepted his resignation on September 8, “effective immediately.” He is listed as “resigned in lieu of termination,” was issued a no-contact order for his current and former students and is no longer allowed on UT property without prior approval from the university. Grissino-Mayer is not allowed to hold the title of professor emeritus.

As of August 16, 2019, the final report on the third investigation was released to the public. With verbal and written complaints filed by 11 women, both current and past students, along with witness accounts of inappropriate actions, the department of OEDs investigation came to the conclusion that Grissino-Mayer's misconduct spanned years and that the allegations “more likely than not are true.”
