= Charles Beare =

British violin expert, craftsman and dealer (1937–2025)

Charles Beare OBE
- Beare, c. 2010
- Born: Charles Theodore Sydney Beare; 22 May 1937; London, England
- Died: 26 April 2025 (aged 87); London, England
- Occupations: Luthier; violin expert; dealer
- Years active: 1961–2025
- Children: 4

Charles Theodore Sydney Beare OBE (22 May 1937 – 26 April 2025) was a British luthier, violin expert and dealer. In 2001 The New York Times described Beare as "the most esteemed authenticator in the world." In 2002 CNN characterized him as the "world's most respected violin dealer". Fourth of five generations of a family of violin experts, he was a director of Beare Violins Limited until February 2025.

== Early life and education ==
Beare was born in London on 22 May 1937, the stepson of William Beare. He completed National Service before he began studying violin making in 1958. Beare studied first in Germany at the Mittenwald School from 1958 before travelling to the United States at the invitation of Rembert Wurlitzer, training under Simone Fernando Sacconi. Over sixteen months, he studied 110 Stradivari instruments and 57 Guarneri instruments. Wurlitzer taught him how to look at instruments and introduced him to violin dealing.

== Career ==
In 1961, he returned to the United Kingdom, where his family had been in the profession for three generations, initially as Beare, Goodwin & Co. from 1892, then incorporated as J & A Beare in 1954. During his time at the head of the family's business, he became an authority on authenticating and identifying violins as well as being one of the only tradesman entrusted to repair and maintain instruments by such artists as Yehudi Menuhin, Yo-Yo Ma, Nathan Milstein, Jacqueline du Pré, Mstislav Rostropovich, Isaac Stern, Pinchas Zukerman; he also built up a well-reputed workshop team. During his time in service, the market for violins changed from a time when an orchestra violinist could afford a violin by an Italian master to one where these instruments became objects of speculation. He countered the process by facilitating sponsorship for soloists such as Nigel Kennedy.

Beginning in 1966, when his friend Paul Rosenbaum died, he began researching the lives of Venetian makers, a project Rosenbaum had begun. Beare kept researching for life without publishing it. He wrote a book about 44 instruments presented at a Stradivari exhibition in Cremona in 1987 that he organised. He shared his expertise also in contributions to the New Grove Dictionary of Music and Musicians. He frequently lectured at both the American Federation of Violin and Bow Makers and the Violin Society of America.

In 1998, J & A Beare changed its name to Beare Violins Ltd and gave its old name to a new venture formed jointly with another London-based firm. Beare was a director of both companies but resigned as a director of J & A Beare in November 2012, and from his subsequent role as consultant in September 2013. He returned to work in November 2014 through the original family company, Beare Violins Ltd, and subsequently concentrated on writing certificates of authenticity for instruments of the violin family. It is estimated that Beare signed more than 5,000 certificates of authenticity throughout his career.

In 2001 The New York Times described Beare as "the most esteemed authenticator in the world." In 2002 CNN characterized him as the "world's most respected violin dealer".

== Personal life and death ==
Beare's sons, Peter and Freddie, are the fifth generation in the Beare family to take up the profession.

Beare died in London on 26 April 2025, at the age of 87.

== Awards, honours and memberships ==
Beare was an honorary member (and onetime president) of the EILA (International Association of Violin and Bow Makers), a member of the British Antique Dealers' Association, an honorary fellow of the Royal Academy of Music and was made an honorary citizen of Cremona, Italy, following the 1987 Stradivari exhibition. He was awarded an OBE in the 2004 New Year Honours for services to the music industry.
