= Joseph Nagyvary =

Joseph Nagyvary, born April 18, 1934, is a retired professor of biochemistry and biophysics at Texas A&M University. He is also a violin maker, and has spent years studying and analyzing violins made by Antonio Stradivari and Giuseppe Guarneri.

== Biography ==
Joseph Nagyvary was born 1934 in Szeged, Hungary. As the most celebrated citizen of this town was Albert Szent-Györgyi, the discoverer of vitamin C and much of the citric acid cycle, he was inspired at an early age to follow a career in natural products and biochemistry.

From 1952 to 1956 he attended the Eötvös Loránd University of Budapest. In 1956, during the anti-Communist revolution he we took an active role in fighting the Communists and the Russian invaders (he was sniper) and, after the Russian occupation, he was wanted by the Communist secret police for execution. In the last minute, he succeeded to escape through the Austrian border, while his friend who was with him, was shot by the Russians.

In 1957 he went to Zurich to study under Paul Karrer. There he became fascinated by the violin when he had the opportunity to take lessons on an instrument once owned by one of his heroes, Albert Einstein.

In 1963 he went to Cambridge to study under Alexander Todd at the laboratory there. He moved to the United States in 1964 and in 1968 he moved to Texas where he became a professor of biochemistry and biophysics at Texas A&M University.

In 1983 he devoted his research entirely to the study of recreating the legendary tone of violins made by the old masters.

== Violin research ==
Nagyvary's claims that the secret to Stradivari's sound was leaving the wood to soak in brine. Because of the lack of land in Venice, during that period imported wood was often stored in the seawater of the Venetian Lagoon, where a type of decomposition had a slight effect on the wood. Nagyvary managed to acquire wood shavings from a Stradivarius violin, and under a microscope he found the natural filter plates in the pores between the tracheids were gone.

By late 2003, Nagyvary refined his techniques and produced a violin that was tested in a duel with the Leonardo da Vinci of 1725, an instrument not from Stradivari's golden period. Both violins were played in each of four selections of music by violinist Dalibor Karvay behind a screen to an audience of 600, from which 463 votes were counted (160 trained musicians and 303 regular concert goers). This was the first public comparison of a Stradivari with a contemporary instrument before a large audience where the audience would cast ballots on the performance quality of each violin. Such curtained showcases have been conducted numerous times during the 19th and 20th centuries, and continue in the 21st.

As of 2025, Nagyvary has not received any awards for violin tone or workmanship from any of the international violin competitions.
