= Victor Fétique =

French archetier / bow maker (1872 - 1933)

Victor François Fétique (Mirecourt 1872 – 1933) was a prominent French archetier (bowmaker) from a family of bowmakers.

== Biography ==
Victor, son of Charles-Claude Fétique a violin maker. He learned his craft in Mirecourt with J. B. Husson, Sigisbert Fourrier Maline and Émile Miquel. Later he went on to work for Charles Nicolas Bazin II, before joining Caressa & Français in 1901. He established his own shop in 1913 at 72 rue Myrha in Paris (18th arrondissement). Other than his son, Marcel Gaston Fétique, and his brother Jules Fétique, Claude Thomassin, Auguste Toussain, Claude Rémy, Louis Morizot, Paul Weidhaas and Andre Richaume worked for him. Andre Vigneron (fils) was also known to have made bows for Victor Fétique.

Signed his bows "Vtor Fétique." His bows are patterned after those of François Nicolas Voirin, though less distinct.

Victor Fétique and his workshop made bows for numerous other music houses, including: Collin-Mezin, Granier à Marseille, Caressa & Francais, Chanot & Chardon, J.B.L. Corolla (stamped Nadegini), Paul Jombar, Maucotel & Dechamp, Lucien Schmitt, and Alfred Vidoudez in Geneva.

He was awarded for his personal production the title Meilleur Ouvrier de France (1st Craftsman of France).

"Victor's best bows can be superb playing tools. Some examples which are mounted in G/T, are quite stunning." Gennady Filimonov

"Victor Fetique was capable of producing some very good bows, but the attention of his atelier seemed to focus on quantity, and thus the output is frequently of a more commercial quality." Stefan Hersh

"It is difficult to define the style of a craftsman who worked for such a short time. As already told, his productions consists mainly of two parts. His personal one is influenced by the two schools who shaped him. In his first period he is influenced by his Maestro Charles Nicolas Bazin, later on he will get closer to the Parisian taste of that time: Sartory-Lamy. After the start of his health problems, also the bow quality is affected and has a sharp decrease. Those one made for him, follow his own stylistic shapes but not everybody has the same gifted hands and, as mentioned, the results are not always up to the expectations. In the last period, thanks to the closeness with his nephew Andre Richaume, excellent craftsman who will won an award as best "Ouvriers de France", his quality improves. Andrè builds for his uncle beautiful bows, many mounted in tortoise and gold and he devotes his last years of his life to smooth the way for his descendant." Paolo Sarri (translated from Italian)

"Fetique, Victor: Very hard bows. Firm. Dense sound especially when dense wood used. Some (maybe a minority) poor examples from workshop stamped with his name. These can be short grained, for example. Very tense. Like a German bow but far far warmer in sound. Limited flexibility. Detache works well, however. Fascinating bows; probably the hardest French bow to have been made." Roland Herrera
