= Hans Weisshaar =

American violin restorer (1913 - 1991)

Hans Weisshaar (Wildberg, Baden-Württemberg, Germany, August 25, 1913 - Los Angeles, June 24, 1991) was an important American violin restorer.

He worked in Germany, Switzerland and the Netherlands before coming to the United States in 1937, where he was employed with Simone Sacconi at Emil Herrmann in New York.

In 1947 he moved with his family to Hollywood, California, where he established his own business. He gained a reputation as an expert in the field through extensive teaching, lecturing, and judging in international competitions.

In 1988 he published with Margaret Shipman his Manual for Violin Makers, a work devoted to violin restoration.
