= Jules Fétique =

French archetier / bow maker (1875 - 1951)

Jules Fétique (1875 in Mirecourt (Vosges) – 1951 in Gagny (Seine Saint Denis)) was a prominent French archetier from a family of bowmakers.

Son of Charles Claude Fétique (1853–1911) a violin maker, and brother to Victor Fétique, Jules Fétique served his apprenticeship under Paul Émile Miquel before joining the Bazin Family and Charles Nicolas Bazin. In 1902, Jules Fétique joined the workshop of Eugène Sartory in Paris with whom he remained until 1912. This collaboration had a strong influence on his style. During this period he also worked for his brother Victor Fétique.

In 1912 Jules Fétique worked with 'Caressa & Français' but maintained his collaboration with Eugène Sartory. In 1927, Fétique received the diploma of Meilleur Ouvrier de France (1st Craftsman of France) and in 1937, the Diplôme d'Honneur (Diploma of Honor) at the International Paris Exhibition. By 1934, he left Caressa et Français and established his own workshop in Paris at Rue de Moscou, with André Dugad, who himself was a former collaborator of Caressa et Français. At this time, Fétique ended his collaboration with Eugène Sartory. His style changed and became more influenced by the school of Dominique Peccatte.

== Quotes ==
"Vigneron and Jules Fetique produced bows that at times could rival a Sartory in terms of strength and handling...." Stefan Hersh

"It is unfortunate that Jules Fetique bows are known as a poor man's Sartory (among professionals), because they are superb bows and deserve to be recognized on their own terms (as such). Early work resembles Sartory. Later work is inspired by D. Peccatte ." - Gennady Filimonov

"The production of this craftsman is wide and of an excellent quality, but he, like Bernard Ouchard, having worked more for others than for himself, is less known." Paolo's blog

== Sources ==
- Roda, Joseph (1959). Bows for Musical Instruments. Chicago: W. Lewis. OCLC 906667.
- Vatelot, Étienne (1976). Les Archet Francais. Sernor: M. Dufour. OCLC 2850939.
- Raffin, Jean Francois; Millant, Bernard (2000). L'Archet. Paris: L'Archet Éditions. ISBN 2-9515569-0-X.
- Dictionnaire Universel del Luthiers - René Vannes 1951,1972, 1985 (vol.3)
- Universal Dictionary of Violin & Bow Makers - William Henley 1970
