= Caressa & Français =

Parisian firm that specialized in fine musical instruments and bows

Caressa & Français was a firm in Paris that specialized in fine musical instruments and bows.

It was founded in 1901 by Albert Caressa and Henri Français, both of whom had worked for Gand-Bernardel of Paris (founded in 1866), when they had succeeded (and purchased) the House of Gand et Bernardel, Luthiers du Conservatoire de musique (Luthiers of the Music Conservatory). Over the course of its lifetime this shop became a leading international centre for rare string instruments and was patronized by many of the preeminent names in the concert world. The "Caressa" firm eventually was taken over by Emile Français (son of Henri Français) in 1938 and stayed in business until 1981.

== History ==
The Caressa & Français firm carried on the tradition established by Nicolas Lupot in 1796 through several generations of violin makers including Auguste Sébastien Bernardel, Gustave Bernardel, Ernest Auguste Bernardel, Eugène Gand, and Émile Français (father of Jacques Français).

Albert Caressa served his apprenticeship under Gand-Bernardel in Paris. In 1901, when Gustave Bernardel retired, Caressa became the head of Gand et Bernardel. Together with Henri Français (who also worked for the same firm) as a partner/associate, they ran the firm under the name of Caressa et Français until 1920, at which point Henri Français retired. The House of Caressa was eventually taken over by Emile Français (son of Henri Français) in 1938.

The Caressa & Français firm amassed an important collection of recognized instruments (of the violin family) which included Antonio Stradivarius, Giuseppe Guarneri, Domenico Montagnana, Sanctus Serafin, Lorenzo Storioni, the Rugeri family, Joannes Baptista Guadagnini, Nicolas Lupot, and J. B. Vuillume as well as an important fine bow collection including bows by François Tourte, Dominique Peccatte, Jean Pierre Marie Persois and many others.

Like many of the great Parisian violin firms, Caressa & Français sold bows under its name (branded Caressa & Français). These bows were made by the great makers of the time including Victor Fétique and Claude Thomassin among others.

== Caressa & Français lineage continues ==
Eventually, the Paris-born Jacques Français (3 July 1923 – 4 February 2004), son of Emile Français and Lucile Caressa, carried on the 200-year-old tradition of the family business by opening his own shop in New York City under the name of "Jacques Français Rare Violins Inc." Français's godfather was the violinist Jacques Thibaud.

Although Jacques's passion was art, as he wanted to become an artist, his father Emile insisted and demanded that he stay in the family business. He was sent as an apprentice to Mirecourt, the historical center of French violin-making and then went on to apprentice in Mittenwald, the German equivalent. He served in the Free French Ski Troops during World War II, and subsequently joined the occupation force in Vienna, where his knowledge of French, German and English became a major asset.

According to his wife (Beatrice), Mr. Français then came to New York to apprentice with Rembert Wurlitzer, who ran the most complete violin restoration shop in the country under the guidance of Simone Fernando Sacconi. The following year he returned to Paris to work with his father, "who drilled him intensively on authenticating instruments / recognizing the instrument's origins".

In 1948 Mr. Français came to New York on a one-way ticket with a bunch of instruments and fine etchings, to sell on consignment, and $50 to his name, and rejoined the Wurlitzer firm for a brief period. Having spent time under the tutelage of Master Simone Fernando Sacconi, his skills in expertise, violin making and restoration grew to new heights. He also forged friendships with other masters that have become legendary, most notably Renè Morel.

After many years in the violin trade, he decided to set up his own business. Jacques Français Rare Violins Inc. took up residence in a prominent musical neighborhood, next to Carnegie Hall at 250 W. 54th Street. He put together a team including his friend and colleague Renè Morel (a Master Restorer) and young apprentices. His business employed renowned makers/restorers such as Samuel Zygmuntowicz, Horacio Piñeiro, Boris Sverdlik, David T. Van Zandt, James N. McKean, Jerry Pasewicz, Christophe Landon, Jonathan Woolston (UK), and Richard Oppelt. Today, Gael Français (Jacques Français's nephew) continues to work in the family business.

== Quotes ==
"The Caressa & Français firm carried on the long lineage from the times of Nicolas Lupot, and later culminated with the foremost NYC shop established by Henri Français' grandson Jacques Français (son of Emile Français and Lucile Caressa). Jacques Français' shop became a prominent international centre for rare string instruments and was patronized by many of the preeminent names in the concert world such as Isaac Stern, Yehudi Menuhin, Pablo Casals, Nathan Milstein, David Oistrakh, Erick Friedman, Itzhak Perlman, Michael Rabin, Pinchas Zukerman to name a few." – Gennady Filimonov

"The House of Caressa & Français was one of the world's renowned violin making and repair shops. They had acquired the former House of Gustave Bernardel in 1901 (the former House of Gand & Bernardel Freres in Paris founded by Nicolas Lupot in 1796). Henri sold his share in the business to Albert at the end of World War I. The House of Caressa was eventually taken over by Emile Français in 1938. The shop remained open during the German occupation of Paris in World War II and closed in 1981 after the death of Lucile Caressa Français. The Paris shop was patronized by some of the greatest names in music." – Smithsonian Institution
