= Sławek =

Sławek is a Polish given name and the surname derived from it. The given name is a diminutive from any names with the stem -sław- (Mirosław, Sławomir, etc.). Archaic feminine forms of the surname are Sławkowa (by husband) and Sławkówna (by father). Notable people with the name include:

== Given name ==
- Sławek Jaskułke (born 1979), Polish pianist, composer and bandleader

== Surname ==
- Jakub Sławek (born 1976), Polish politician
- Maria Sławek (born 1988), Polish classical violinist
- Walery Sławek (1930, 1930–1931, 1935), Prime Minister of Poland

== See also ==
- Slávek
