= Marc Laberte =

French luthier and bow maker (1880 - 1963)

Marc A.J. Laberte
- Born: 29 May 1880; Mirecourt
- Died: 29 March 1963 (aged 82); Mirecourt
- Education: Apprenticeship with unknown
- Spouse(s): 1. Marie Adeline Josephine Thérèse Drouin; 2. Geneviève Josephine Paule Francine Thouvenin
- Engineering career
- Discipline: Craftsman
- Practice name: luthier

Marc André Joseph Laberte (29 May 1880 – 29 March 1963) son of Pierre Alexis Auguste Laberte, was trained as a luthier as well as a bow maker. As early as 1911, he began to play an active role in the Laberte-Humbert Frères company.

The Laberte workshop produced large range of instruments and bows consistent in quality, employed over 300 people by 1920. In addition, many skilled master makers worked for Laberte, including Camille Poirson, Charles Brugere, and Georges Apparut. The workshop owned a fine collection of instruments from all the famous makers including Antonio Stradivari, Guarneri del Gesù, Giuseppe filius Andrea Guarneri, Francesco Ruggeri, Nicolas Lupot, Jacob Stainer, and Jean-Baptiste Vuillaume. They were meticulously examined and used as models for their own instruments. The workshop was disrupted in the war, and productions resumed after the war ended. The workshop continued for several years before it eventually closed down.

== Family ==
Marc Laberte was born into a family of violin makers. His great grandfather set up a workshop in Mirecourt around 1780. On 21 May 1904, he married Marie Adeline Josephine Thérèse Drouin, but she died on 15 December 1909. Before her death, she gave birth to André Emile Philippe Laberte; Philippe, as he was known, would become a violin maker like his father. After the death of his first wife, he married again, this time to Geneviève Josephine Paule Francine Thouvenin on 15 April 1912 in Besançon. They had a daughter on 6 June 1916 named Claude.

== Career ==
The firm Laberte Humbert Frères developed a production of instruments alongside its workshop-style production. Instruments bearing the Laberte Humbert label, with or without the LH stamps, are generally regarded as high-quality. Those bearing the Marc Laberte label, sometimes referencing one of the instruments of his collection, are made with attention to the materials and craftsmanship. These instruments were produced by a small team of craftsman known as “l’Atelier des Artistes”, which included Joseph Aubry, Charles Brugère, and Camille Poirson, among others. Georges Apparut, who joined Laberte Humbert Frères in 1902 and remained for 21 years, lead the production.

== The Workshop ==
In 1915 Marc Laberte joined Fourier Magnié (1868–1946) and established the new firm under the name "Laberte-Humbert Frères, Fourier Magnié Réunis". A comprehensive catalogue, including the complete range of products and instruments in the lutherie field was published by the firm that same year.

In 1927, the firm continued its development by buying the well-known trademark "A La Ville de Cremonne” from Paul Mangenot. One can find this mark stamped with its characteristic triangular shape on the inside back of many good Mirecourt violins of the 19th century. Included in the deal was the use of names such as Honoré Derazey, Just Derazey, Paul Mangenot, and Didier Nicolas aîné, the last of whom was first to have used this trademark. Soon thereafter in that same year, a new catalogue including the recently acquired brands was published, this time under the name Laberte & Magnié. This same catalogue includes two pages dedicated to the collection of antique Italian instruments belonging to Marc Laberte and the “copies” available for purchase that were made after the originals. On these instruments, the label of "Marc Laberte, Maître Luthier" appears beside a reproduction of the Italian maker's label.

In 1931, Laberte received the Grand Prix for the Stradivox Magné, a phonograph, which was produced in different versions. These attempts at diversification were made to help the firm withstand the increasing competition and recession effects during that period.

Unfortunately, World War II brought despair on Mirecourt as well as the rest of Europe. The Laberte production ended entirely, as the stock and production tools were raided and stolen. By 1944 the firm resumed its activity, but the production never reached the same levels as prior to the war and eventually the difficult economic climate during the post war years, led to the unavoidable decline of the Laberte production. Philippe Laberte, Marc Laberte's son, joined the firm during this period and tried to maintain a production catered toward the high end of the market. Marc Laberte died in 1963.

== Honors and awards ==
- 1910 Grand Prix. International Exhibition, Brussels (Belgium)
- 1914 Grand Prix. International Exhibition, Lyon (France)
- 1919 Grand Prix. International Exhibition, Strasbourg (France)
- 1923 Grand Prix, Rio de Janeiro (Brazil)
- 1931 Grand Prix, Exposition Coloniale, Paris (France)
- 1935 Grand Prix. International Exhibition, Brussels (Belgium)

== Labels ==
List of names used in Laberte Humbert Frères trade instruments.

- C. Bailly
- F. Barbé
- Nicolas Bernard
- Nicolas Bertholini
- F. Breton
- H. Clotelle
- Jean-Baptiste Colin
- M. Couturieux
- H. Denis
- J. Didelot
- Gabriel Didion
- G. Fournier
- Jacques Leclerc
- D. Soriot

== See also ==
- Jérôme Thibouville-Lamy
- Jean-Baptiste Vuillaume
