= JTL =

JTL may refer to:

- jtL, a South Korean boy band
- J. T. Lambert Intermediate School, in Monroe County, Pennsylvania, United States
- Jérôme Thibouville-Lamy, a 19th-century French musical instrument making company
- Jonathan Tiernan-Locke, a retired British racing cyclist
