= Charles Francois Langonet =

Violin maker

- Born: 1860
- Died: 1929 (aged 68–69)
- Occupation: Luthier
- Instruments: String instruments

Charles Francois Langonet (II) (1860–1929) was born in Mirecourt, France, and was a highly regarded violin maker and restorer.

== Early life ==
He was born into a respected line of master luthiers and started making violins at a very early age. He was apprenticed to Alexandre Delanoy at Mirecourt.

== Career ==
Jean-Baptiste Vuillaume visited the workshop and upon seeing Charles' work commented "This lad is a future Stradivarius". At the age of 19, Alfred Hill, also an apprentice at Mirecourt, persuaded Charles to move to London where he spent nearly 50 years working for W. E. Hill & Sons (apart from three years military service back in France), eventually becoming head of violin making and restoring. He was affectionately referred to as Papa Langonet by his colleagues. During this time many of the world's finest instruments passed through his hands, including the Viotti Stradivarius, the Alard Stradivarius, the Tuscan Stradivarius and the Messiah Stradivarius. He witnessed the opening of 'Le Messie' at Hill's workshop in Hanwell after Alfred Hill decided to remove the belly and subsequently ordered the replacement of the bar. He is reputedly one of only three men (along with Alfred Hill and Hill's restorer 'Prunier') to have inspected the inner details since its creation in 1716.

Because he spent many years creating instruments for W.E. Hill, C.F Langonet labelled instruments are extremely rare but highly regarded. In 1955, an article dedicated to him featured in The Strad, alongside pictures of one of his personally labelled violins - a copy of Gennaro Gagliano and described as 'an outstanding example of the luthier's art... by one of the finest makers who has worked in this country for many years'.
