= Maria Sławek =

Polish classical violinist (born 1988)

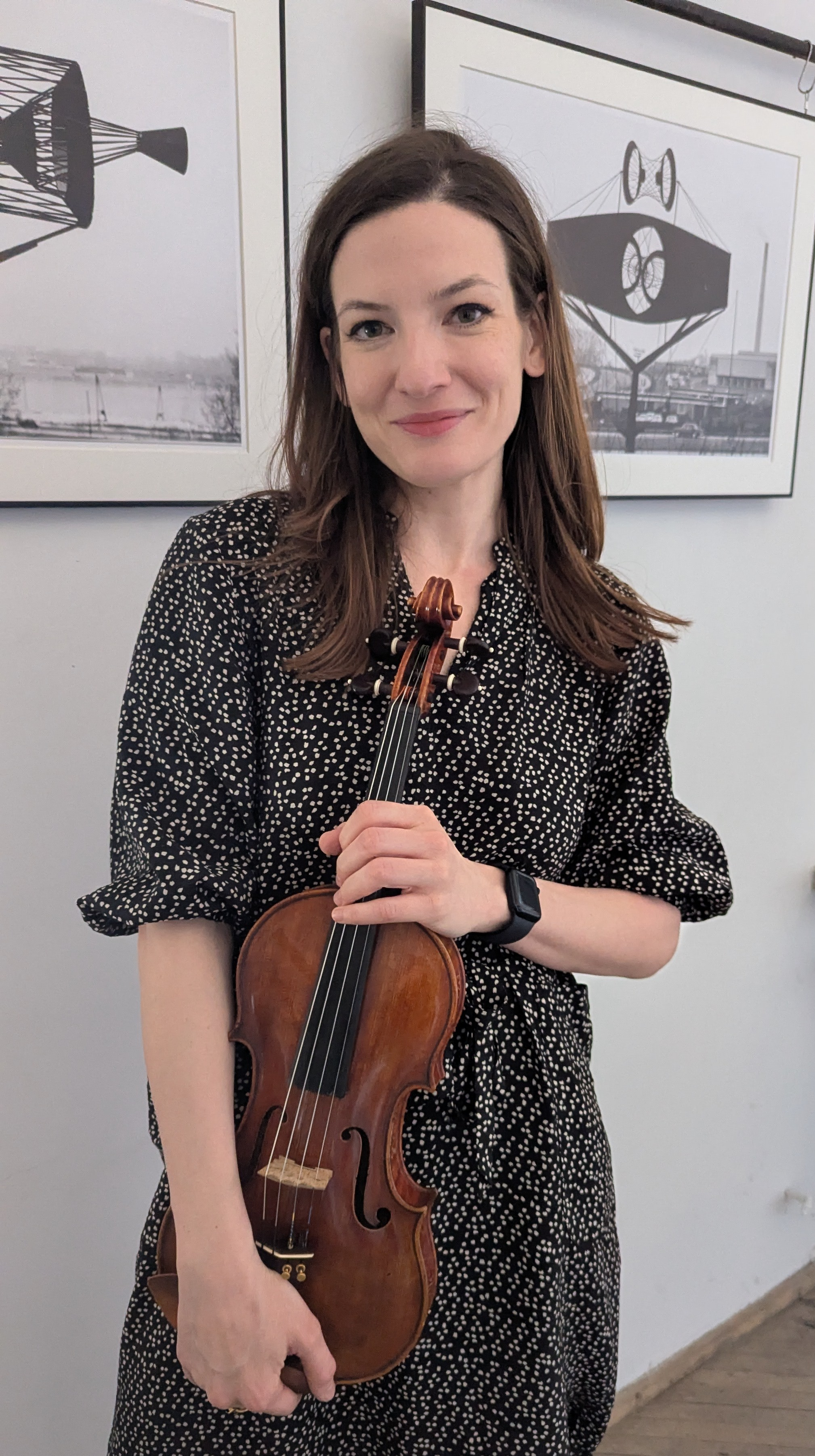
- Born: Maria Sławek; 24 February 1988 (age 38); Gdańsk, Poland
- Citizenship: Polish
- Education: Academy of Music in Kraków, University of Music and Performing Arts Vienna
- Occupation: violinist

Maria Sławek (born 24 February 1988) is a Polish classical violinist, performing internationally and teaching at the Academy of Music in Kraków. Her repertoire ranges from J.S. Bach to contemporary composers.

== Biography ==
She received her musical education in Gdańsk and afterwards at the Academy of Music in Kraków (2006–2011), where she studied under Prof. Wiesław Kwaśny, who also supervised her doctoral thesis on Mieczysław Weinberg`s works for violin and piano in 2015. She has also taken violin lessons with Dora Schwarzberg at the University of Music and Performing Arts Vienna, with Kaja Danczowska, Maxim Vengerov and Wanda Wiłkomirska.

Playing chamber music Maria Sławek cooperates among others with Piotr Różański (pianist) and Marcin Zdunik (cellist), who partnered her with CD recordings. In 2020 Maria Sławek received her higher degree in arts (habilitation), equivalent with tenure.

Maria Sławek is specially interested in Mieczysław Weinberg, working on his heritage in double role of a musician and researcher. In 2020 she became a co-founder of the Mieczysław Weinberg Institute Foundation, settled in Warsaw.

She has performed in a number of European countries, as well as in the US and Brazil. In 2017–2018 she was an artist-in-residence of the Karol Szymanowski Philharmonic in Kraków. She plays Charles François Gand`s instrument from the Nicolas Lupot`s workshop (Paris 1817).

== Discography ==
- Schumann, Prokofiew (with Piotr Różański, pianist), Grupa Twórcza Castello 2013 (R. Schumann, Violin Sonata in D minor No. 2 Op. 121; S. Prokofiev, Violin Sonata in F minor No. 1 Op. 80);
- Mieczysław Weinberg (with Piotr Różański, pianist), CD Accord 2014 (M. Weinberg, Sonata No. 4 for violin and piano Op. 39; Sonatina for violin and piano Op. 46; Sonata No. 5 for violin and piano Op. 53)
- Rejoice (with Marcin Zdunik, cellist), CD Accord 2019 (reedited as a double LP in 2020); works: J. S. Bach, 15 Two-Part Inventions, BWV 772-786; E. Ysayë, Sonata in A minor Op. 27 No. 2; K. Penderecki, Ciaccona in memoriam Giovanni Paolo II; S. Gubaidulina, Sonata Rejoice!.

Source.
