= NFV =

NFV may refer to:

- Network function virtualization
- Nicolas François Vuillaume (1802–1876), French luthier
- Northern German Football Association (Norddeutscher Fußball-Verband)
- Nelfinavir, an antiretroviral drug used in the treatment of the HIV
