= Langonet =

The Langonet Dynasty were a family of violin makers originating in Mirecourt, France, from around 1737 until the late 1900s.

The family can possibly be traced back to an Antoine Lantonet of Commercy who started work at Mirecourt in 1737 and subsequently altered his name to Langonet. In 1955 Alfred Charles Langonet possessed a violin labelled 'Antoine Lantonnet, 1770' which suggests the maker experimented with various versions of the name before settling on Langonet.

Nicolas Langonet (1764–1831) - Luthier and winemaker.

Claude Francois Langonet (1793–1898) - Luthier and winemaker. Three sons; Claude, Charles and Georges, who all became luthiers.

Charles Francois Langonet (I) (1826 in Mirecourt – 1898 in Mirecourt) - was a manufacturer of pegs, tailpieces and other fittings at Mirecourt. He had four sons, all related to the violin trade: Charles, Roget, Albert and Eugene.

Charles Francois Langonet (II) (1860–1929). Affectionately known as Papa Langonet among his colleagues, Charles was a highly respected master violin maker and restorer. He was apprenticed to Alexandre Delanoy at Mirecourt, alongside another apprentice, Alfred Ebbsworth Hill (who would later become partner in Messrs. W.E. Hill & Sons, London). During his apprenticeship at Mirecourt, Jean-Baptiste Vuillaume visited and upon seeing Charles' work commented "This lad is a future Stradivarius". At the age of 19, Alfred Hill persuaded Charles to move to London where he spent nearly 50 years working for W. E. Hill & Sons, eventually becoming head of violin making and restoring. During this time many of the world's finest instruments passed through his hands, including the Messiah Stradivarius. He witnessed the opening of 'Le Messie' at Hill's workshop in Hanwell and is reputedly one of only three men (along with Alfred Hill and Hill's restorer 'Prunier') to have inspected the inner details since its creation in 1716. C.F Langonet labelled instruments are extremely rare but highly regarded. In 1955, an article on him featured in The Strad, alongside pictures of one of his violins - a copy of Gennaro Gagliano and described as 'an outstanding example of the luthier's art... by one of the finest makers who has worked in this country for many years'. Had two children, Marie and Charles.

Eugene Langonet (1875–1959). Apprenticed to Chipot-Vuillaume and then worked for Paul Mangenot before several years employment at W.E. Hill and Sons. Returned to France and worked for Sylvestre and Maucotel, Paris. Established his own business on Rue de l'Heronniere, Nantes 1910. Won silver medal at Nantes Exhibition 1924 and Medaillle D'or Paris 1926.

Charles Francois Langonet (III) | Frank Langonet (1888–1963). Known as Frank. Served his apprenticeship at Mirecourt before returning to London where he spent 36 years working for W.E. Hill & Sons. Renowned as an expert restorer and worked on many of the world's finest instruments including many Stradivarius. Set up his own business, C.F. Langonet & Son, in 1946 with his son Alfred. Keen amateur photographer, he also photographed many of his restorations. Had two children, Joan and Alfred.

Alfred Charles Langonet (1917–1973). Served his apprenticeship under his father Frank at the workshop of W.E. Hill & Sons before joining the RAF for the war years. Highly regarded violin maker and restorer and winner of notable awards for violin making, including: Silver Medal at the 1949 Stradivari Exhibition at Cremona.[3] Special Diploma 1949, The Hague. Winner Festival of Britain Competition for Best British Violin 1951. Winner of the British Violin Makers Exhibition 1952.

== Langonet Collection ==
The Langonet collection of instruments and bows was gradually sold off before the death of Alfred, the last in line, but many of the Langonet tools, cutting patterns and varnishes (including those for Le Messie Strad etc.,), personal documentation and business records etc., survive after passing down from generation to generation.
