= François Perrin =

French violin maker (1754 - 1830)

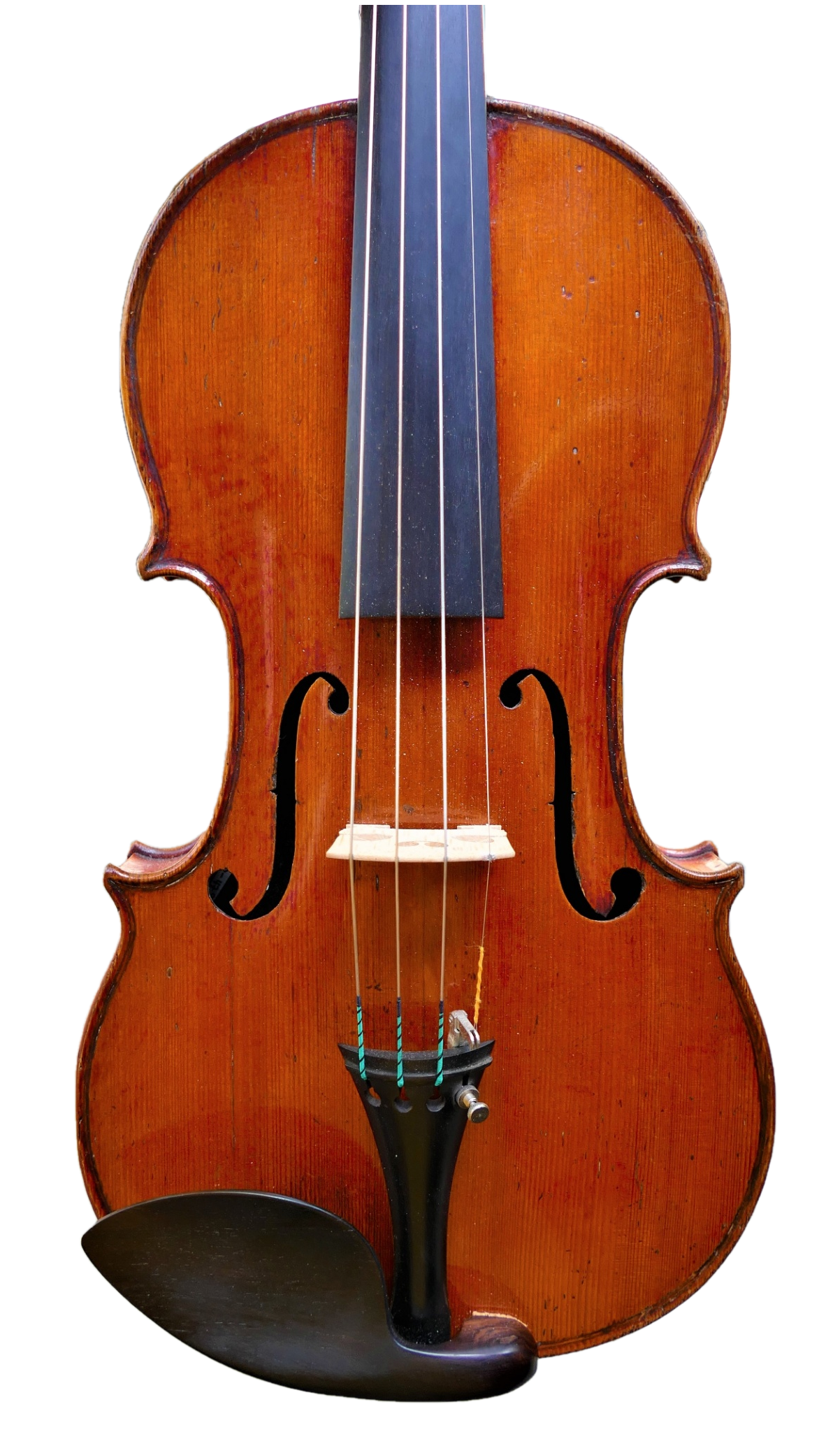
- A violin by Perrin ca.1780-1800
- Born: François Perrin (Perain) c. 1754; Bainville-aux-Saules, Duchy of Lorraine
- Died: 6 February 1830 (aged 75–76); Mirecourt, France
- Known for: Luthier
- Movement: Mirecourt school

François Perrin; (c. 1754 – 6 February 1830) was a French violin maker who worked in Mirecourt. His work is characteristic of the Mirecourt school patterns of the time. Few of his violins survive but show good craftsmanship. Instruments that bear the stamp “François Perain” were also made by Perrin, as he used this alternate spelling in some of his violins and violas. His son Étienne Perrin succeeded him in the craft, and stamped his instruments "E. PERRIN FILS".

== Style and characteristics of his instruments ==
Although some sources claim he was active between 1775 and 1800, several violins bearing his brand are clearly modeled on the work of Didier Nicolas l'aîné and François Breton, whose broader models became common in Mirecourt during the irst quarter of the nineteenth century. This would suggest Perrin was still making instruments well into the 1800s.

Perrin is known to have made at least one viola and one cello, with the majority of his instruments being violins (at least 9 have been documented online).

=== Early instruments ===
Some of his first works are similar in style to “provincial” French making of the 18th century, with a long curved pegbox (similar to the style of Nicolas Augustin Chappuy) and more angular f-holes. A violin from the end of this period carries the paper label "Francois Perain a Paris" (pictured below). However, it is not known if Perrin ever made violins in the French capital.

=== Middle period ===
Before 1800, the influence of the broader Mirecourt model is evident; his f-holes are much closer to the C-bouts and also placed very high on the top plate. Curved bee sting purfling pointing towards the middle of the C-bout can sometimes be seen. The edges of the table and back are raised and pointed, and his varnish is often golden brown.

=== Later works ===
The later violins ascribed to him (1800-1820s) fit much more neatly with the style of Didier Nicolas l’ainé; they have a wider body, squarer shoulders and a darker brown varnish. It is this style that is eventually adopted by his son Étienne in the 1830s. Some violins made in the 19th century with François' stamp are raising doubts whether they were made by his son instead given the striking similarity in style.

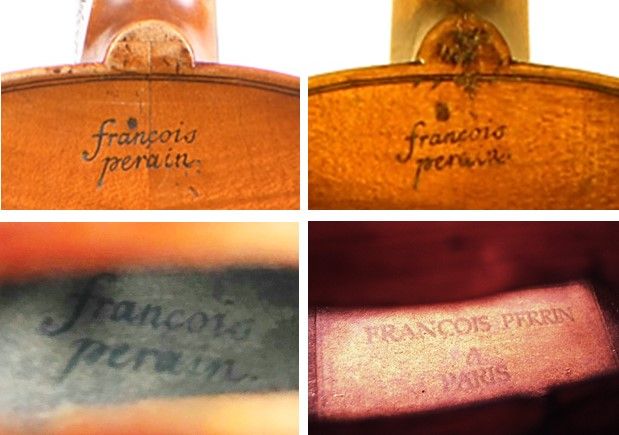
The different stamps and labels used by François Perrin

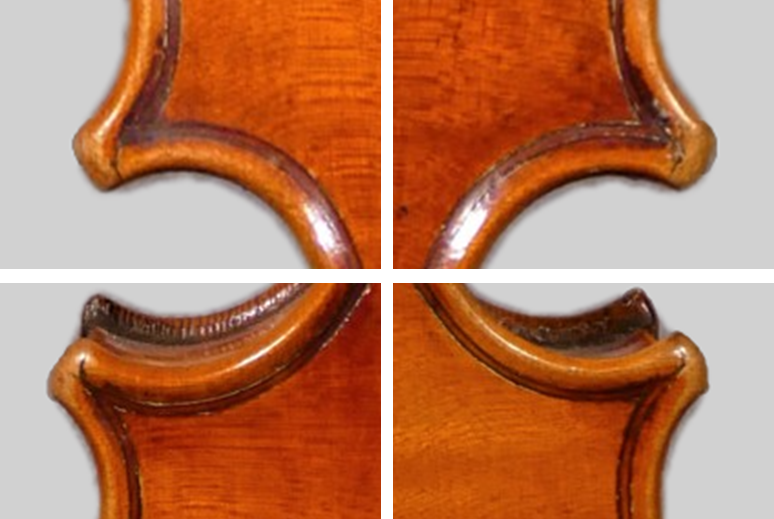
The distinctive purfling on the back of a violin by François Perrin, present on only some of his violins

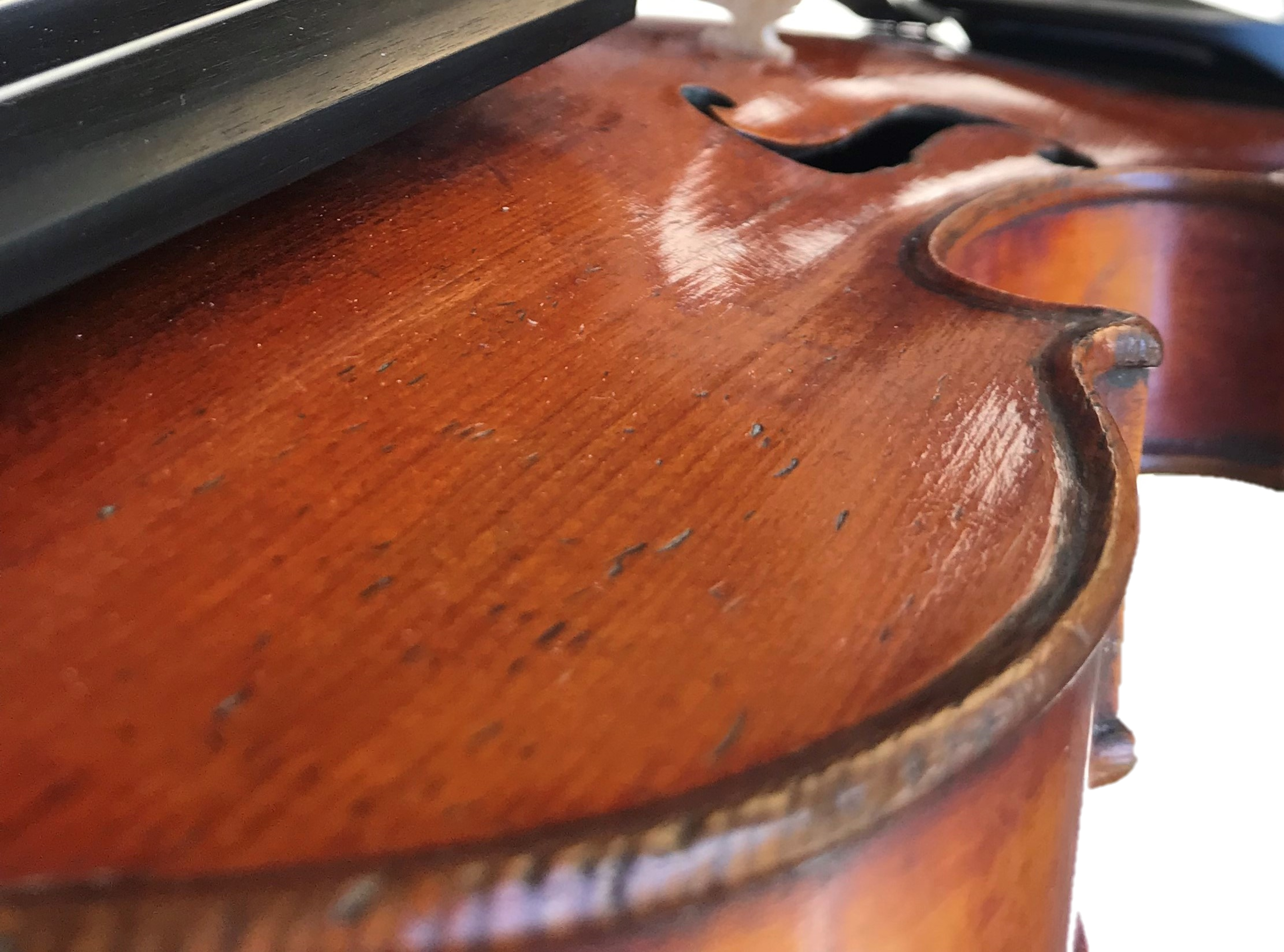
Raised Edges of a François Perrin Violin Top Plate
