= Charles Jean Baptiste Collin-Mezin =

French luthier and archetier (1841–1923)

Ch.J.B Collin-Mezin
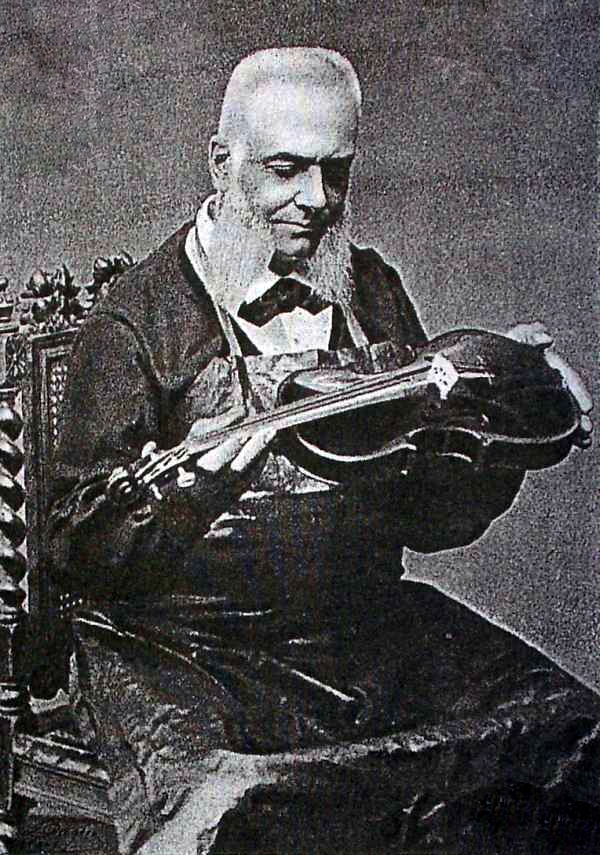
- Ch.J.B Collin-Mezin
- Born: 1841; Mirecourt, France
- Died: 1923 (aged 81–82); Paris
- Known for: violin making
- Children: Charles Collin-Mezin, Jr.

Charles Jean Baptiste Collin-Mezin (1841–1923) was a French maker of violins, violas, cellos, basses and bows. He was an Officier de l'Académie des Beaux-Arts and won gold and silver medals at the Paris Exhibitions in 1878, 1889, and 1900.

He was the son of luthier C. L. Collin, and father of Charles Collin-Mezin, Jr., also a luthier.

The Henley Dictionary of Violin Makers gives him a long and glowing report.

== Collin-Mezin’s career ==
Born in Mirecourt, Collin-Mezin apprenticed with his father. Some sources say he worked for a period in the Brussels workshop of Nicolas-François Vuillaume. In 1868 he moved to Paris where he established himself as one of the premier French luthiers of his day. His instruments were considered superior over other new violins.

Collin-Mezin was friends with influential people who helped popularize his instruments. He was also connected to musical luminaries of his day, whose opinions he sought out.

A number of famous violinists played on his instruments, and praised their quality and playability, including Joseph Joachim, Sivori, Scott Tixier, Léonard, Marie Tayau, and Jules Armingaud, who considered a Collin-Mezin equal to a Stradivari for flexibility of sound. The famous cellists Franchomme and Jacquard played on Collin-Mezins.

== Characteristics of his instruments and craftsmanship ==
Like the best French luthiers, his designs followed in the tradition of the famous Italian schools Stradivarius, Guarnerius, and Amati, although he developed his own unique varnish.

- varnish tends to be thick and dull, ranging in colour from yellow to brownish yellow
- they typically have a black outline along the edges of the body and scroll
- no artificial process of heating or chemically treating the wood
- constructed of old wood that was dried naturally
- the bass barring (as well as other aspects) adjusted according to the age and type of wood he used
- his best work is approximately from 1875 to 1910

His instruments are also characterized by a powerful and unusually brilliant tone, but also possessed a harshness when new. Musical historian William Henley, in his Universal Dictionary of Violin and Bow Makers (1959), suggests that this harshness could be eliminated with "many years of strenuous playing," which would then certainly enable the instrument to be played by an active soloist.

Henley records that “Benjamin Godard's Concerto Romantique was first performed at a Pasedeloup Concert, Paris, 1876, by Marie Tayau on a Collin-Mézin violin with (what was then an innovation) E and A steel strings suggested by the maker, which rather points to the fact that he is attempting to get brilliance and clearness at the expense of purity." Steel strings are more popular today, though they tend to be used more by students. (More advanced players and professionals prefer synthetic or gut core strings wound with metal, and an all-metal E string.)

== How to recognize an authentic Collin-Mezin ==
- Many but not all authentic Collin-Mezins have a hand-written signature in addition to a label (according to Henley).
- Violins with later dates have a Grand Prix label in addition to the hand written signature.
- On the side of his original sound posts there is a stamp of "Collin-Mézin," a copyright facsimile of his signature.
- His labels are not to be confused with the violins of his son and collaborator Charles Collin-Mezin, Jr., whose instruments are also of high quality but priced more moderately. The labels of Collin-Mezin, Jr's instruments still contain labels with his father's name, and indicate that they are “par Ch J. B. Collin-Mézin.” These mention "Paris" (even though many were made in Mirecourt after 1924), and also mention "Grand Prix Exposition."

== His labels ==
From 1868 to 1876

Longeur: 9 cent. Lauteur: 2 cent
Ch J. B. Collin-Mézin fils
Luthier. Paris l'an 1870

From 1876 onwards

Longeur: 9 cent. Hauteur 3½
Ch. J. B. Collin-Mézin
Luthier á Paris
Rue du Faubg: Poissonnière No. 29

Ch. J. B. Collin-Mézin
Luthier á Paris
Rue du Faubg: Poissonnière No. 10
(Up to 1883, some instruments with earlier labels "Ch. J. B. Collin-Mézin fils" were still found. All labels were changed to "Ch. J. B. Collin-Mézin" afterwards. )

His later violins

Ch. J. B. Collin-Mézin
Luthier C. M
Grand Prix-Exposition Universelle, 1900
Paris, 1921
