= Jakub Biskup =

Polish footballer

Personal information
- Full name: Jakub Biskup
- Date of birth: 8 May 1983 (age 43)
- Place of birth: Puck, Poland
- Height: 1.71 m (5 ft 7 in)
- Position: Midfielder

Senior career*
Years	Team	Apps	(Gls)
2001–2002	Bałtyk Gdynia	4	(0)
2003	Kaszuby Połchowo		(3)
2004	Kaszubia Kościerzyna		(3)
2004–2006	Lechia Gdańsk	53	(7)
2006–2008	Odra Wodzisław	44	(2)
2008–2009	ŁKS Łódź	28	(0)
2009–2011	Piast Gliwice	53	(12)
2011–2016	Termalica Bruk-Bet Nieciecza	112	(21)
2016–2018	Chojniczanka Chojnice	39	(6)
2018–2019	Bałtyk Gdynia	21	(3)
- * Club domestic league appearances and goals

Jakub Biskup (born 8 May 1983) is a Polish former professional footballer who played as a midfielder.

== Honours ==
Lechia Gdańsk

- III liga, gr. II: 2004–05
