= Julienne Bloch =

French educator and writer

- Born: 11 August 1833; Mutzig, Kingdom of France
- Died: 12 November 1868 (aged 35)
- Occupations: Educator, writer
- Writing career
- Language: French

Julienne Bloch (11 August 1833 – 12 November 1868) was a French educator and writer. She was one of the earliest published Jewish women writers in France.

== Biography ==
Bloch was the eldest daughter of Simon Bloch (1810–1879), founder and editor of the journal L'univers israélite. She received a teaching license at the age of sixteen, and devoted herself to Jewish education. For two years, when she was about twenty-five years of age, she directed the institution for young girls at Lyon, founded by the local Jewish community. Afterwards she co-directed the establishment of her sister Pauline Pereira in Paris.

From June 1854 to August 1861, Bloch published a series of articles in her father's paper under the title "Lettres d'une Parisienne." These articles provided complex analyses of French society, the role of women in Judaism, and the dangers of Jewish assimilation. In a series of letters to Eugène de Mirecourt, she criticized the writer's negative descriptions of well-known Jews.

She died of tuberculosis on 12 November 1868, at the age of 35.
