= Eugène de Mirecourt =

French writer and journalist

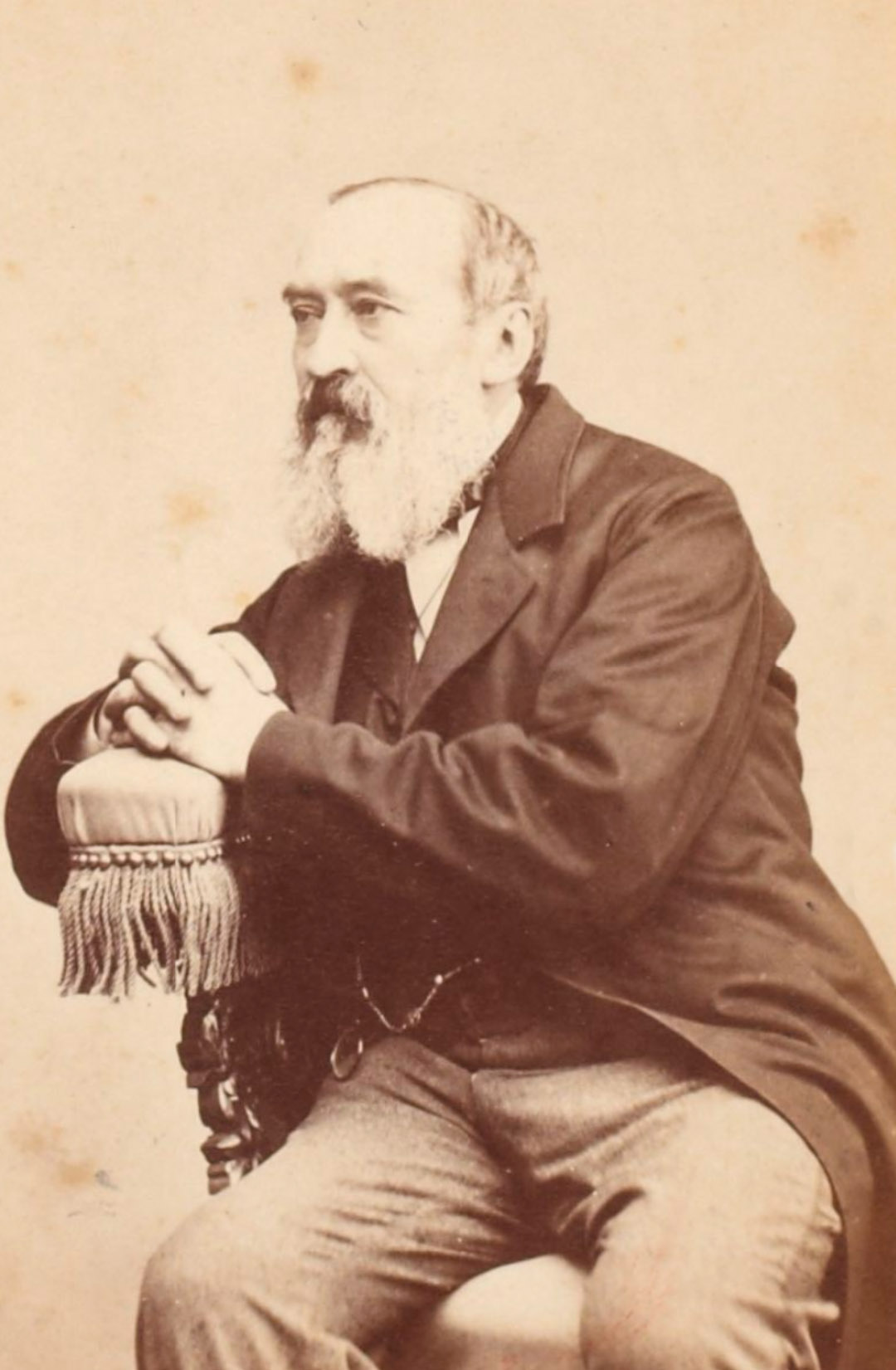
- Born: Charles Jean-Baptiste Jacquot; 19 November 1812; Mirecourt, Vosges, French First Republic
- Died: 13 February 1880 (aged 67); Haïti
- Occupations: Novelist; Biographer; Journalist; Satirist

Signature
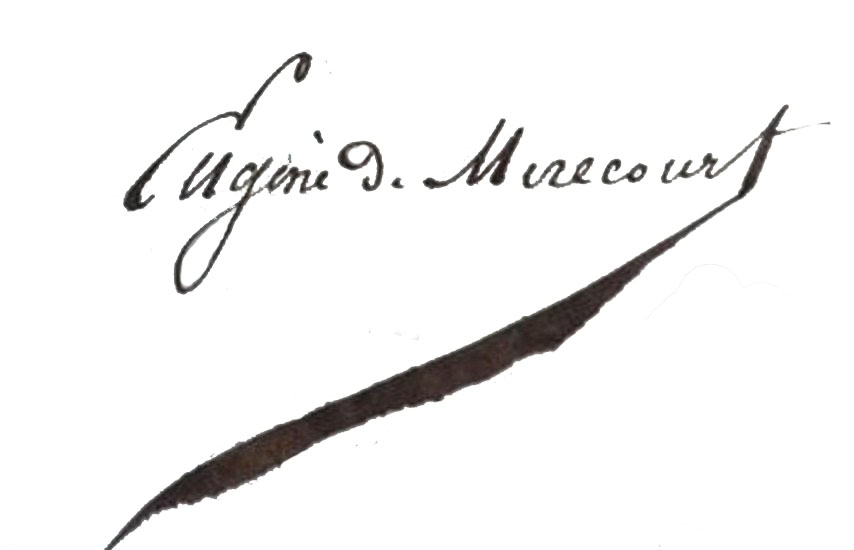

Charles Jean-Baptiste Jacquot (19 November 1812 – 13 February 1880), who wrote under the pen name Eugène de Mirecourt, was a French writer and journalist. He is most famous for having been the main critic of Alexandre Dumas.

== Life ==
Born in Mirecourt, Vosges, Jacquot was the son of Nicolas Jacquot and Marie-Joséphine Petit-Jean. He studied for the priesthood at a seminary, but left it to pursue literature. After having worked for some time as a pension master in Chartres, he began working as a journalist, using the pen name Eugène de Mirecourt.

After some short stories, he published, together with Leupol, a three-volume work, "la Lorraine" (Nancy, 1839–1840), which gave his name a certain notoriety. It was then that he began to publicize the many collaborations that Alexandre Dumas had used in the series of novels published under that name. In his pamphlet Fabrique de Romans: Maison Alexandre Dumas & Cie, fabrique de romans (1845), Mirecourt denounced the fact that Dumas' work was written by others and thus contributed to the spread of a figurative meaning of the word nègre (ghostwriter in French). Because he used abusive, devaluing and deliberately racist language about Dumas' appearance, smell, morals and "black" nature, the latter filed a complaint. Mirecourt was sentenced to six months in prison and a fine.

Mirecourt then published several novels, and wrote a drama with Fournier, Mme de Tencin. His brochure against Alexandre Dumas had inspired him to review celebrities of the time: in 1854, he began the Gallery of Contemporaries, which raised opposition from the press. Among the hundred contemporaries portrayed were Hector Berlioz and George Sand.

After the Gallerie finished in 1857, Mirecourt founded the weekly Les Contemporains. In this serial, each issue contained a biographical article penned in his typically biting style. It resulted in fierce disputes and many trials in which the courts judged him severely. His term Contemporains was used by other journalists.

At the end of his life, he entered the Dominicans of Ploërmel, became a priest, and was sent to teach in Haïti, where he died at the age of 67.

== Works ==
Works by Mirecourt are held by the French National Library. These include the following:

- Les Contemporains, 100 issues published by Gustave Havard from 1854 to 1858, each containing a satirical biography of celebrities from politics, literature and the arts.
  - Meyerbeer, 1854, Éd. J.-P. Roret & Cie, Paris (in Les Contemporains)
  - Rothschild, 1855
  - Madame Anaïs Ségalas, Paris, G. Havard, 1856
- Confessions de Marion Delorme, 1856
- Mémoires de Ninon de Lenclos, 1857
- La Bourse et les signes du siècle, Paris: E. Dentu and Humbert, 1863, 399 p
- Avant, pendant et après la Terreur, Paris, Dentu, 1866 (reviewed by Zola on 12 April 1866)
- Balzac, Librairie des contemporains, Paris, 1869

== See also ==
- Julienne Bloch

== Sources ==
- Ferdinand Hoefer: Nouvelle Biographie générale, t. 35, Paris, Firmin-Didot, 1861, p. 660-661.
- Grand dictionnaire universel du XIXe : français, historique, géographique, mythologique, bibliographique... T. 17 Suppl. 2, by M. Pierre Larousse (p. 1597)
