= Bainville-aux-Saules =

- Commune
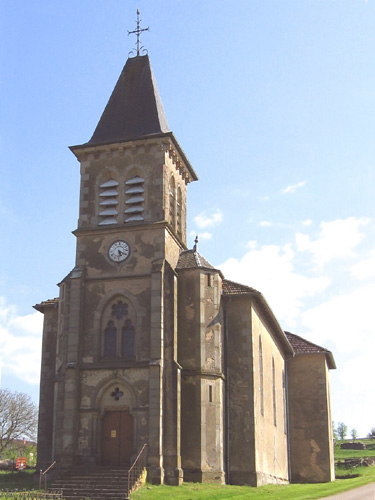
- The church in Bainville-aux-Saules

- Coat of arms
- Location of Bainville-aux-Saules
- Location within France Location within Grand Est
- Coordinates: 48°12′26″N 6°08′17″E
- Country: France
- Region: Grand Est
- Department: Vosges
- Arrondissement: Neufchâteau
- Canton: Darney
- Intercommunality: CC Mirecourt Dompaire

Government
  - Mayor (2020–2026): Gérald Noël
- Area^{1}: 5.61 km^{2} (2.17 sq mi)
- Elevation: 300 m (980 ft)
- Highest elevation: 382 m (1,253 ft)
- Lowest elevation: 283 m (928 ft)
- Population (2023): 148
  - Density: 26.4/km^{2} (68.3/sq mi)
- Time zone: UTC+01:00 (CET)
  - Summer (DST): UTC+02:00 (CEST)
- INSEE/Postal code: 88030 /88270
- ^{1} French Land Register data, which excludes lakes, ponds, glaciers > 1 km^{2} (0.386 sq mi or 247 acres) and river estuaries.

Bainville-aux-Saules (French pronunciation: [bɛ̃vil o sol]) is a commune in Lorraine, part of the Vosges department, in Grand Est in northeastern France.

== Geography ==
The river Madon flows through the commune.

== Notable residents ==
- François Perrin (1754–1830), violin maker

== See also ==
- Communes of the Vosges department
