= Mirecourt =

- Commune
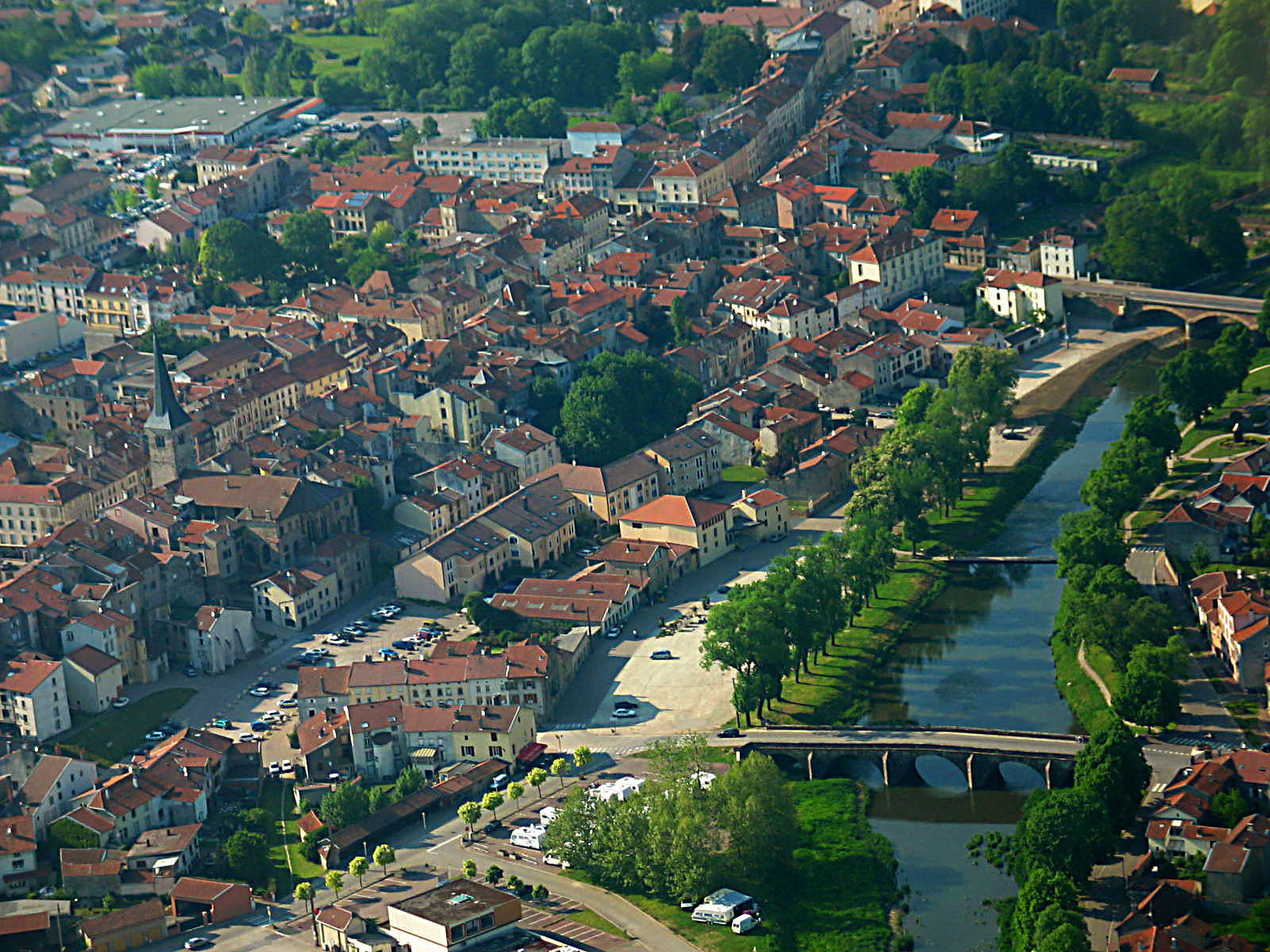
- An aerial view of Mirecourt

- Flag Coat of arms
- Location of Mirecourt
- Location within France Location within Grand Est
- Coordinates: 48°18′07″N 6°08′03″E
- Country: France
- Region: Grand Est
- Department: Vosges
- Arrondissement: Épinal
- Canton: Mirecourt
- Intercommunality: CC Mirecourt Dompaire

Government
  - Mayor (2020–2026): Yves Séjourné
- Area^{1}: 12.12 km^{2} (4.68 sq mi)
- Elevation: 285 m (935 ft)
- Highest elevation: 378 m (1,240 ft)
- Lowest elevation: 261 m (856 ft)
- Population (2023): 4,700
  - Density: 390/km^{2} (1,000/sq mi)
- Time zone: UTC+01:00 (CET)
  - Summer (DST): UTC+02:00 (CEST)
- INSEE/Postal code: 88304 /88500
- ^{1} French Land Register data, which excludes lakes, ponds, glaciers > 1 km^{2} (0.386 sq mi or 247 acres) and river estuaries.

Mirecourt (French: [miʁkuʁ]) is a commune in the Vosges department in Grand Est in northeastern France. Mirecourt is known for lace-making and the manufacture of musical instruments, particularly those of the violin family.

== Geography ==
Mirecourt is the administrative capital of a canton positioned in the Xantois district at the heart of the Vosges plain, at the confluence of the River Madon with the Arol Valley. Most of the town is laid out on the west side of the Madon on a succession of levels. Visitors are attracted by the richness of the town's architecture and by the natural advantages of the site.

Mirecourt is also at the heart of a road crossing, 24 kilometres (15 miles) from Vittel, 35 kilometres (22 mi) from Épinal to the east by southeast, 40 kilometres (25 mi) from Neufchâteau and 48 kilometres (30 mi) from Nancy. For much of the twentieth century Mirecourt was a staging post on the RN66, a major road towards Paris. Following improvements to the autoroute network towards the end of the twentieth century, the nearest major routes to Paris are now, the A31 autoroute and the RN57 respectively some fifteen kilometres (9.3 miles) to the west and to the east. The RN 66 has been correspondingly declassified: elements of the economic focus that once followed the old route nationale has followed the traffic away to the newer routes: in the final forty years of the twentieth century the registered population declined by around 25%.

== Population ==
Historical population
Year	Pop.	±% p.a.
1968	8,804	—
1975	8,649	−0.25%
1982	7,940	−1.21%
1990	6,900	−1.74%
1999	6,384	−0.86%
2007	5,956	−0.86%
2012	5,774	−0.62%
2017	5,246	−1.90%
2023	4,700	−1.82%
Source: INSEE

Inhabitants are called Mirecurtiens in French.

== Economy ==
=== Artisanal ===
An unusual feature of Mirecourt is the extent to which the local economy continues to be underpinned by the same skilled crafts that have supported the local community for centuries. Both musical instrument and lace making bring significant amounts of wealth and employment to twenty-first century Mirecourt.

==== String instruments ====
Mirecourt's tradition of luthierie seems to date back to the end of the sixteenth century and the travels of the Dukes of Lorraine and their retinues to Italy. The first violin makers date back to as early as 1602 with Mr. Clabec, Jean de Fourcelle and Barbelin, followed by Nicolas Gérard and Demange Aubertin in 1619 and 1623; during the Thirty Years' War (1631–1661), violins were no longer mentioned in city records, but by 1673 four families of violin makers were in Mirecourt. It was particularly in Mirecourt that the business of making stringed instruments took off, with 43 luthiers in 1635, and the business continued to grow into the twentieth century, by when it was claimed that Mirecourt was producing more than 80,000 instruments annually. This was frequently a family business which can grow into a dynastic one: numbered among Mirecourt's Lutherie dynasties have been the Derazey, Mennégand, Aldric, Lupot, Langonet, Gand, Bernard, Jacquot, Nicolas, Mougenot, Charotte, Apparut, Hilaire, Buthod, Collin, Laberte, Magnié, Peccate, Bazin, Ouchard, Chanot, and Vuillaume families including, most famously, Jean-Baptiste Vuillaume 1798 - 1875. Jean-Baptiste Vuillaume worked with famous violinist Niccolo Paganini.

Luthier Didier Nicolas (1757–1833) is most likely the first violin maker to manufacture violins repeatedly in Mirecourt. Born and raised in Mirecourt, he did his apprenticeship here and founded his shop A la Ville de Cremonne. He also founded a workshop, called D. Nicolas Aine, which became one of the most successful in Mirecourt.

At the end of the 19th century, H. R. Haweis wrote "Mirecourt now stands out as perhaps the greatest and most excellent emporium of modern violin manufacture," and "the names of Maucotel, Medard, Mennegand, Silvestre, and Derazay, and above all Vuillaume, must always shed an imperishable lustre upon the little town in the Vosges mountains."

By 1925 the craft was organised into 18 workshops and 4 factories employing 680 workers. The economic and political hardships of the mid-twentieth century coincided with the disappearance of the workshops. However, the creation in the 1970s at Mirecourt of the National School of Lutherie (École nationale de lutherie) signaled a renaissance which has endured into the present century. Notably, Jean-Jacques Pages has produced outstanding instruments by copying famous eighteenth century models by the likes of Stradivarius and Amati. The Gérome brothers, now retired from making guitars and mandolins, have had their work endorsed by Georges Brassens who has purchased one of their guitars.

The industry is celebrated by the presence in Mirecourt of the Musée de la Lutherie et de l'Archèterie françaises.

==== Lace ====
Lace making is believed to have been introduced to Lorraine only in the sixteenth century, when the art arrived from Lombardy with the violin makers sponsored by the Dukes of Lorraine. Peter Fourier, the priest at nearby Mattaincourt, who would subsequently become a saint in recognition of his energetic Counter-Reformation work resisting the Protestant currents from east of the River Rhine, established the Convent of Notre-Dame (Our Lady) and there encouraged instruction in lace making both at the school which was operated by the Sisters and at the orphanage. The project was a great success with daughters of rich families and with girls of the peasant class. By 1790 lace makers from Mirecourt were supplying merchants from abroad, and despite the political and social turbulence of the early nineteenth century, the lace business continued to flourish and grow, with the middle of the nineteenth century a golden age. Nevertheless, by the middle of the twentieth century lace had fallen out of favour and the industry locally was much diminished. It has nevertheless survived, and today, supported by 140 participants, the Mirecourt lace business has recovered some of its international reputation. Lace making courses and permanent exhibitions of the craft remain a feature of the town.

=== Public and service sectors ===
The Vosges psychiatric hospital (le centre hospitalier psychiatrique/CHS) remains the largest employer in the commune of Mirecourt, with over 1,000 salaried staff on the payroll.

The commune's territory also contains the Mirecourt-Epinal aerodrome, which is managed by the departmental Chamber of Commerce.

== History ==
Mirecourt was founded during the first millennium. Mercuri Curtis was dedicated by the Romans to the cult of the god Mercury. Early on, the town was part of the property of the Counts of Toul.

The first surviving written record of Mirecourt dates from 960. This is the text of a donation made by a man called Urson who transferred his domain of Mirecourt (two farmsteads and environs) to the Abbey of Bouxières-aux-Dames.

The heirs to the Counts of Toul were the Dukes of Lorraine who owned the little town during the thirteenth century. An act of 1284, during the time of Duke Frederick III, confirms the annexation of Mirecourt and its lands to the Duchy of Lorraine. Mirecourt, the main town in the important Vôge Bailiwick, was above all a great trading centre. A European focus of economic and commercial energy during the sixteenth century was Lombardy from where the Dukes of Lorraine introduced to Mirecourt the manufacture of string instruments, a tradition which continues to flourish. At the same time Mirecourt became a centre of organ building.

The last Duke of Lorraine to rule the territory was the former Polish king, Stanisław Leszczyński. He died early in 1766 and Lorraine passed to his great-grandson, the future French King Louis XVI. In this way the long struggle to control the territories between France and the Rhine was settled in a manner which no doubt would have pleased Le Grand Monarque. Ten years later, in 1776, the office of Lieutenant-General of the Bailiwick was sold to the young François de Neufchâteau.

Under the secular regime established in the wake of the French Revolution, Mirecourt became the administrative centre of the district and then of the entire arrondissement. This last distinction was lost in 1926, and today Mirecourt falls within the Arrondissement of Neufchâteau.

One of the first boys' primary schools in France was founded at Mirecourt in 1828.

== Personalities ==
- Louis Buffet (1818–1898), statesman
- Charles Louis Buthod (1810–1889), French violin maker, became director of the Thibouville-Lamy firm
- François Perrin (1754–1830), French violin maker
- Charles Jean Baptiste Collin-Mezin (1841–1923), French violin maker
- Peter Fourier (1565–1640), scholar, saint and Counter-Reformation campaigner
- François Chamoux (1915–2007), Hellenist, archaeologist
- Jean-Marie Georgeot (born 1923), biblical scholar
- Charles Jean-Baptiste Jacquot (1812–1880), writer, known under the pen name Eugène de Mirecourt
- Jack Lang (born 1939), Socialist Party politician
- Bernard Ouchard (1925–1979), bow maker
- Jérôme Thibouville-Lamy, French mass production musical instrument maker, had his factory there from 1860
- Jean-Baptiste Vuillaume (1798–1875), French violin maker
- Nicolas François Vuillaume (1802–1876), French violin maker

== See also ==
- Communes of the Vosges department
