= Heinrich Joseph Horwitz =

German lawyer and liberal politician

Prussian House of Representatives
- In office 1877–1879
- Constituency: Liebenwerda, Torgau

Member of the Reichstag
- In office 1883–1887
- Constituency: Liebenwerda
- In office 1890–1893
- Constituency: Mühlhausen

Personal details
- Born: 28 April 1824 Putzig, Kingdom of Prussia (Puck, Poland)
- Died: 17 November 1899 (aged 75) Berlin, Germany
- Party: National Liberal Party; Liberal Union (Germany); German Free-minded Party
- Education: Humboldt University; University of Heidelberg
- Occupation: lawyer

Heinrich Joseph Horwitz (28 April 1824 – 17 November 1899) was a German lawyer and liberal politician.

== Biography ==
Horwitz was born in Putzig, Kingdom of Prussia (Puck, Poland), he was born to Jewish parents but later converted to Lutheranism. Horwitz started to study medicine at the University of Berlin but switched to law at the University of Heidelberg, he began to practise as a lawyer in Bad Liebenwerda in 1858 and in Grünberg (Zielona Góra) in 1862. In 1867 Horwitz moved to Berlin, where he became a town councillor in 1870. In 1877 he was elected a member of the Prussian House of Representatives and a member of the Reichstag from 1883 to 1887 and from 1890 to 1893. He represented the National Liberal Party, the Liberal Union (Germany) and the German Free-minded Party.

Horwitz died in Berlin in 1899.
