= Alfred Charles Langonet =

- Born: 1917
- Died: 1973
- Occupation(s): Luthier, businessman
- Instruments: String instruments

Alfred Charles Langonet (1917–1973) was an English violin maker and founder, along with his father Charles Francois 'Frank' Langonet, of the firm C. F. Langonet & Son.

Last in line to the Langonet dynasty of violin makers, he was apprenticed to his father in the workshop at W. E. Hill & Sons before joining the RAF aged 19.

Langonet served with No. 209 Squadron RAF Coastal Command during World War II and was a rigger aboard the PBY Catalina that spotted the German battleship Bismarck.

After the war he went into business with his father, and C. F. Langonet & Son opened in 1946 at 71 Brondesbury Road, London.

Alfred Charles Langonet won notable awards for violin making, including:

- Silver Medal at the 1949 Stradivari Exhibition at Cremona.
- Special Diploma 1949, The Hague.
- Winner Festival of Britain Competition for Best British Violin 1951.
- Winner of the British Violin Makers Exhibition 1952.

Alfred was married to cellist Phyllis Woodward (1908–1997). Her uncle, John Wesley Woodward, was the cellist aboard the Titanic. (See Musicians of the RMS Titanic.)
