= Charles Buthod =

French luthier (1810–1889)

Charles Louis Buthod (1810–1889) was a French luthier, best known for his violins and cellos. Based in Paris, he worked in his early career for the legendary French luthier Jean-Baptiste Vuillaume, rising to become foreman of his workshop. He later set up his own business nearby, producing violins and cellos, based like many of Vuillaume's, on those of Antonius Stradivarius, probably using the dimensions he had access to while working under his former employer, who owned and copied a number of the works from the master of Cremona.

Buthod's violins, dating from circa 1850 to 1870 are notable for their distinctive red varnish and robust and durable construction, and were awarded a number of medals for their workmanship and tone, although later works attributable to his name vary in quality.

Buthod was involved with establishing the Thibouville-Lamy company -which took over and used his name and label - the labels of these being undated and with the quality varying a good deal.
