= Puck, Poland =

Puck
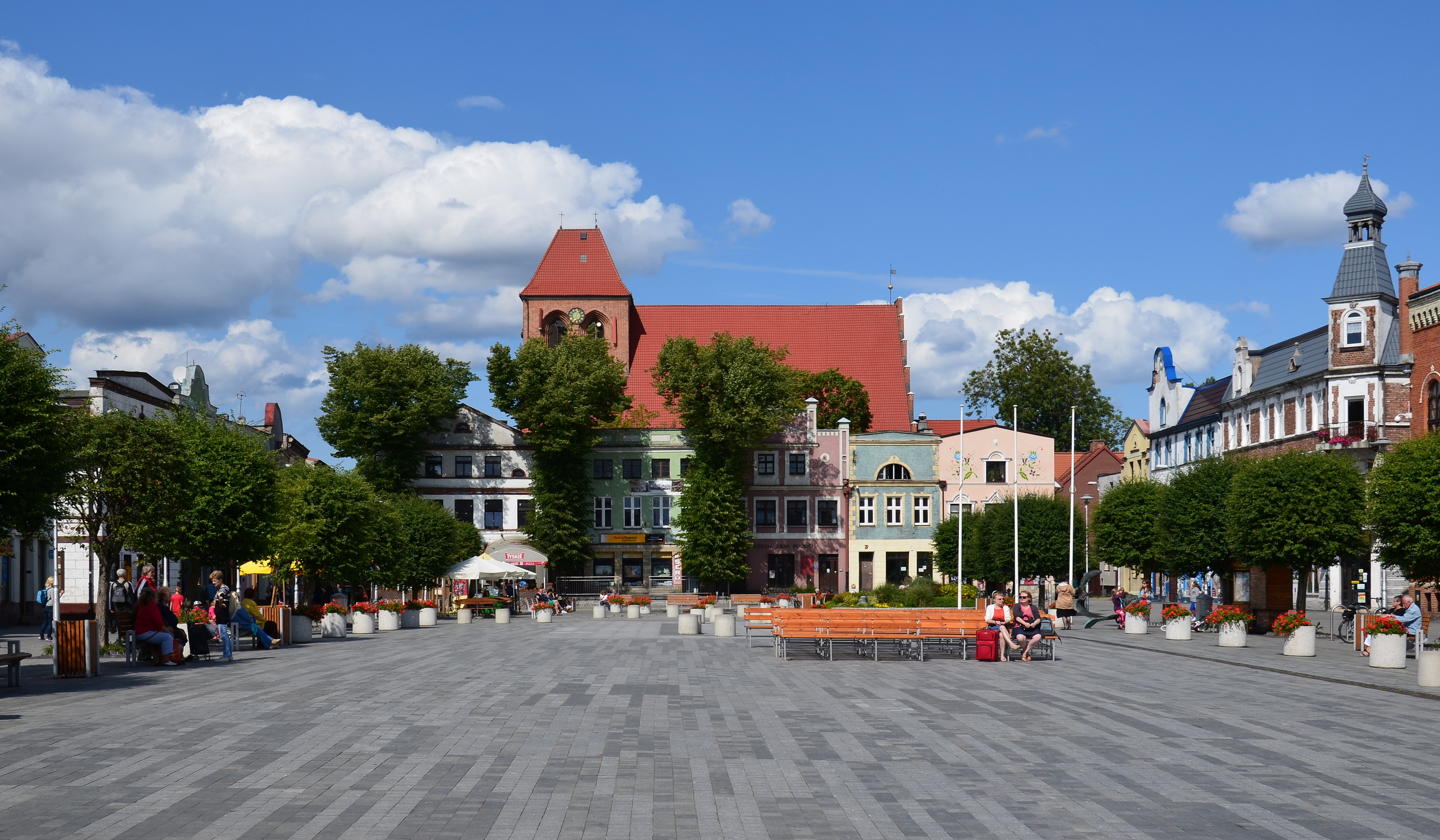
- Market Square

- Flag Coat of arms
- Interactive map of Puck
- Location within Poland
- Coordinates: 54°42′N 18°24′E
- Country: Poland
- Voivodeship: Pomeranian
- County: Puck
- Gmina: Puck (urban gmina)
- Established: 12th century
- Town rights: 1348

Government
  - Mayor: Hanna Pruchniewska

Area
  - City: 16 km^{2} (6.2 sq mi)
- Highest elevation: 20 m (66 ft)
- Lowest elevation: 0 m (0 ft)

Population (2006)
  - City: 11,329
  - Density: 710/km^{2} (1,800/sq mi)
  - Metro: 1,080,700
- Time zone: UTC+1 (CET)
  - Summer (DST): UTC+2 (CEST)
- Postal code: 84-100
- Area code: +48 58
- Car plates: GPU
- Website: puck.pl

Puck (Polish pronunciation: [put͡sk]; Kashubian: Pùckò, Pùck, Pëck, formerly German: Putzig, pronounced [ˈpʊtsɪç]) is a town in northern Poland with 11,350 inhabitants. It is in Gdańsk Pomerania on the south coast of the Baltic Sea (Bay of Puck) and part of Kashubia with many Kashubian speakers in the town. Previously in the Gdańsk Voivodeship (1975–1998), Puck has been the capital of Puck County in the Pomeranian Voivodeship since 1999.

== History ==
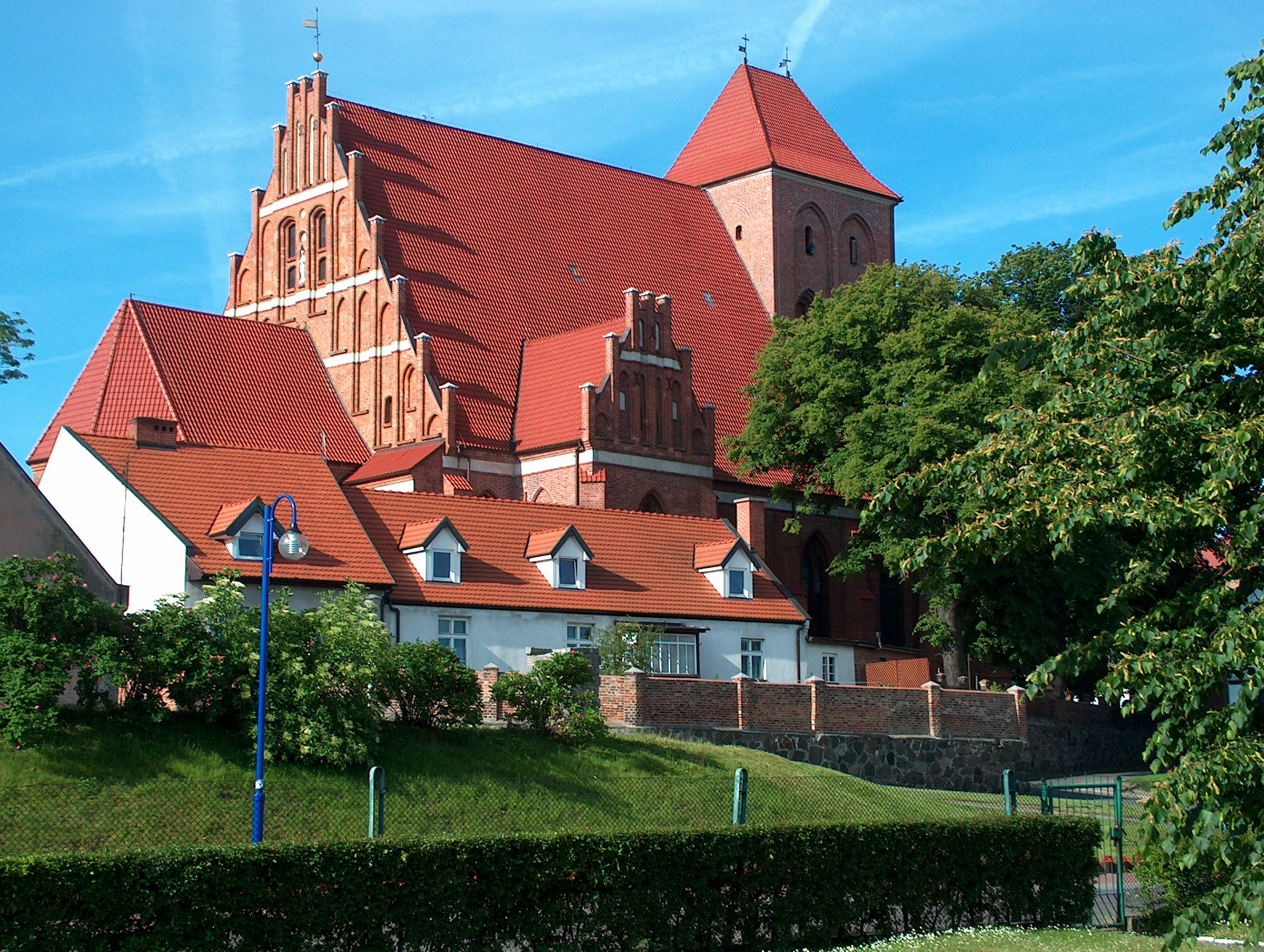
13th-century Gothic Church of Saints Peter and Paul

The settlement became a marketplace and a seaport as early as the 7th century. The name, as was common during the Middle Ages, was spelled differently: in a 1277 document Putzc, 1277 Pusecz, 1288 Puczse and Putsk, 1289 Pucz. It was part of Poland, and in 1309, it was annexed by the Teutonic Order. Puck achieved town status in 1348. The town's first hospital was founded in the 14th century. In the late 14th or the early 15th century, a castle was built.

In 1440, the town joined the Prussian Confederation, which opposed Teutonic rule, and upon the request of which King Casimir IV Jagiellon re-incorporated the territory to the Kingdom of Poland in 1454. The Teutonic Knights renounced any claims in a 1466 peace treaty. It was the seat of local County Administration (Starostwo) within the Pomeranian Voivodeship in the province of Royal Prussia in the Greater Poland Province. The starosts resided in the castle, which was later expanded and also housed the arsenal.

The Polish kings tried to create a fleet at Danzig (Gdańsk), but the autonomous Hanseatic Danzig would not allow them in their territory. Ships chartered by Poland had to land at Puck in 1567. Poland tried to establish the Polish Navy and gained the use some harbors in Livonia and Finland, but a standing navy never materialized. King Sigismund III Vasa also tried to establish a fleet in his attempts to wrest the crown of Sweden from King Gustavus Adolphus of Sweden, but it was destroyed in 1628. In 1655–1656, Puck was successfully defended during a Swedish siege in time of the Swedish invasion of Poland. The town, including the castle, was spared from serious damage, but the hospital was destroyed. Polish King John III Sobieski funded the construction of a new hospital, completed in 1681.

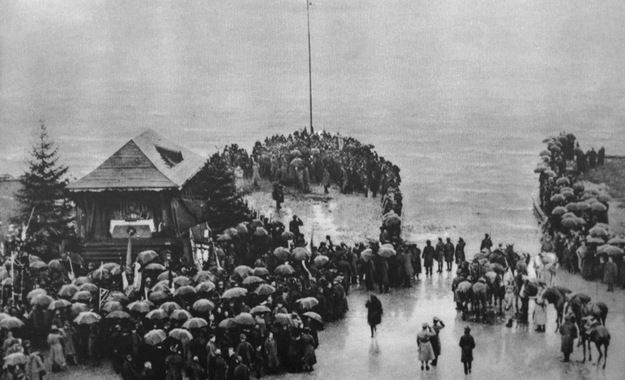
Poland's Wedding to the Sea in Puck in 1920

In 1772, in the First Partition of Poland, the town was annexed by the Kingdom of Prussia, and in 1773, it became part of the newly established province of West Prussia. The Prussian administration dismantled the castle and the remains of the medieval town walls. The town, as Putzig, became part of Germany in 1871. In 1913, it became the garrison of the first planes of the Imperial German Navy. After World War I, Poland regained independence and Puck was ceded to the Second Polish Republic in accordance with the Treaty of Versailles. In 1920, Poland celebrated Poland's Wedding to the Sea in Puck. The first actual Polish Navy was founded at the end of World War I in 1918 with some French and British involvement. Puck, the only Polish harbor until Gdynia was built in the 1920s, served as the main harbor of the Polish Navy until World War II.

=== World War II ===
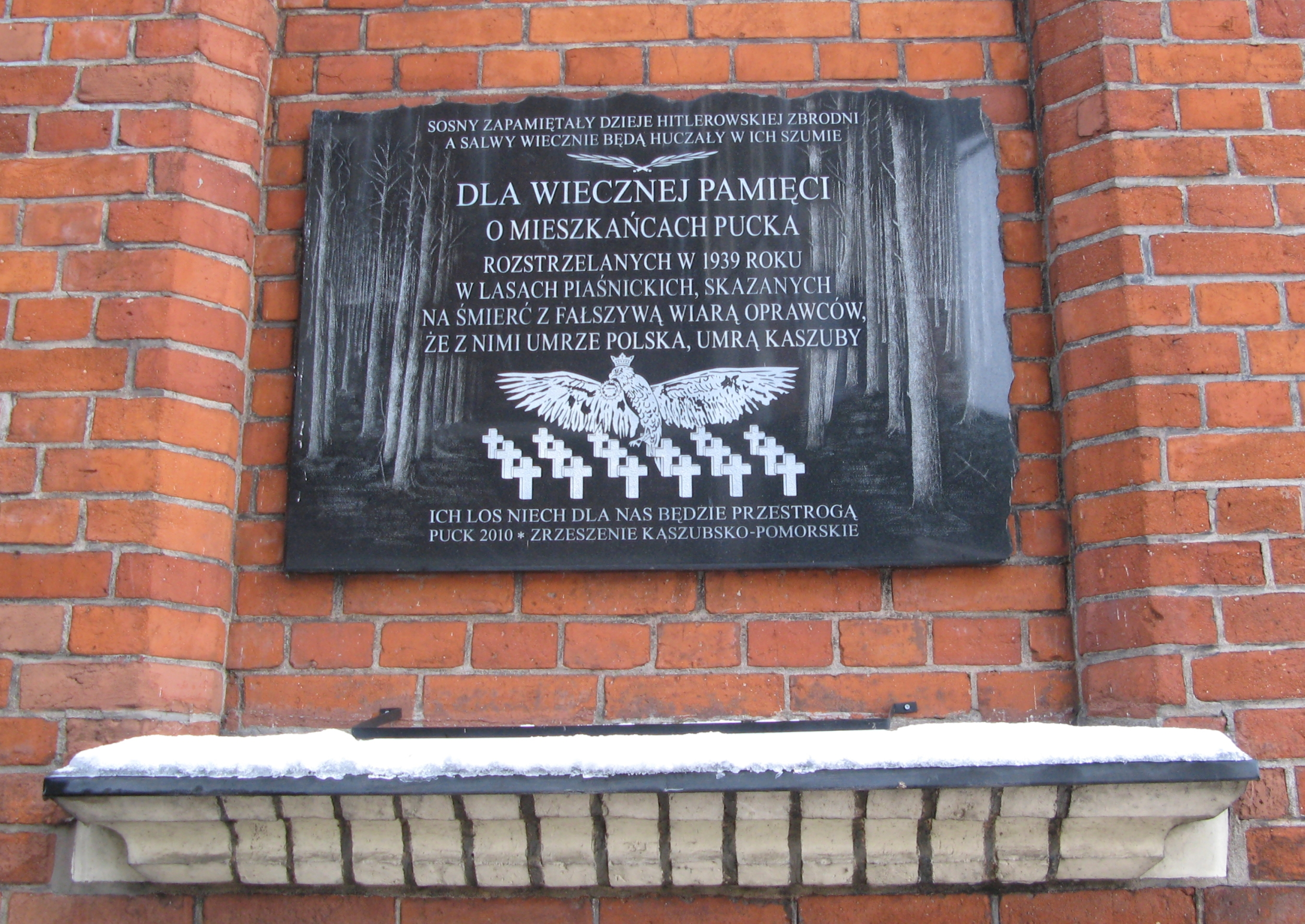
Memorial plaque at the town hall dedicated to inhabitants of Puck murdered by the Germans in the Piaśnica massacre in 1939

Puck was bombed by Nazi Germany at 5.20 a.m. Polish time on Friday September 1, known thereafter as Grey Friday, the first day of the invasion of Poland, which started World War II. Luftwaffe bombers dropped a projectile on the town, which also had an airbase for the Naval Air Squadron and dealt significant damage to the Polish air force units stationed there.

During the subsequent German occupation of Poland, many Poles from the region, including officials, merchants, directors, teachers, judges, priests, notaries, railwaymen, pharmacists, blacksmiths, technicians, postmen and farmers, were imprisoned in Puck and afterwards murdered in the Piaśnica massacre as part of the Intelligenzaktion. In November 1939, the SS expelled Polish families, which were either murdered in the massacres or deported to Nazi concentration camps. Polish students from local high schools were also massacred in Piaśnica.

In the building of the local brewery in 1940, the Germans created a transit camp in which the racial selection of the expelled Polish inhabitants of the region was carried out. Those considered to be "racially valuable" were deported to Germanisation camps and labor camps in Germany, and the rest were expelled to the General Government. Poles expelled from Gmina Dziemiany were used as forced labour in the local factory. The German Nazi administration operated a branch of the Stutthof concentration camp in Puck from 1941 to 1944. In 1945, after the war, Puck was restored to Poland.

== Interesting places ==
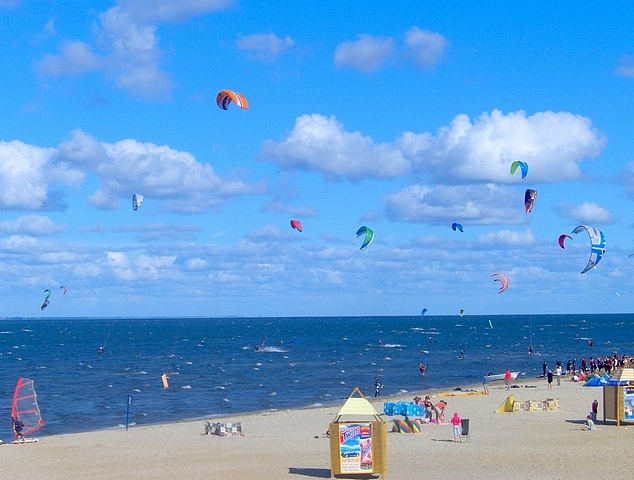
Kitesurfing at the beach

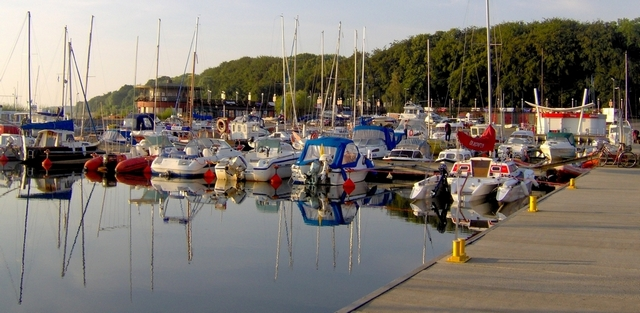
Marina

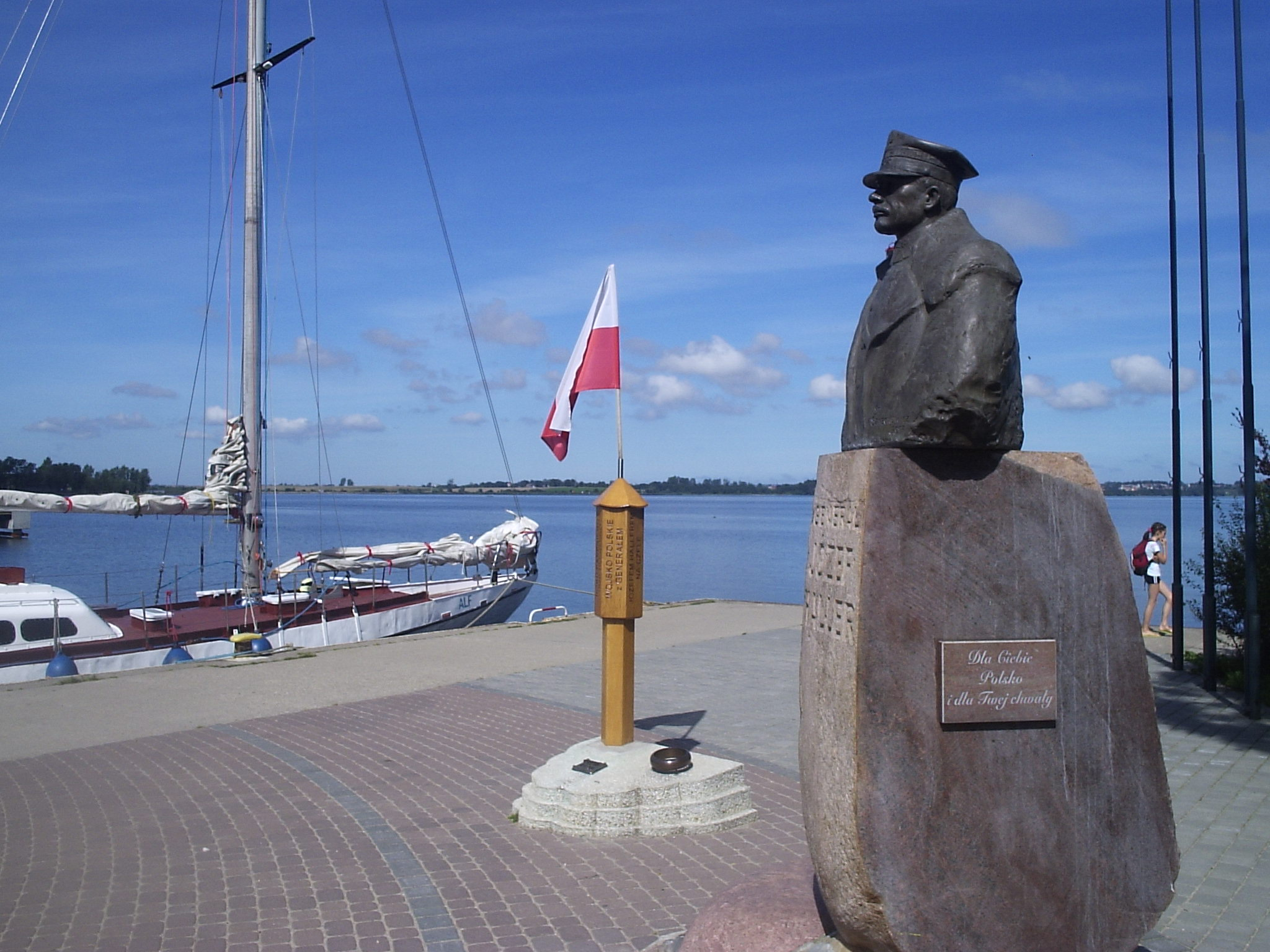
Memorials of gen. Jozef Haller and Poland's Wedding to the Sea

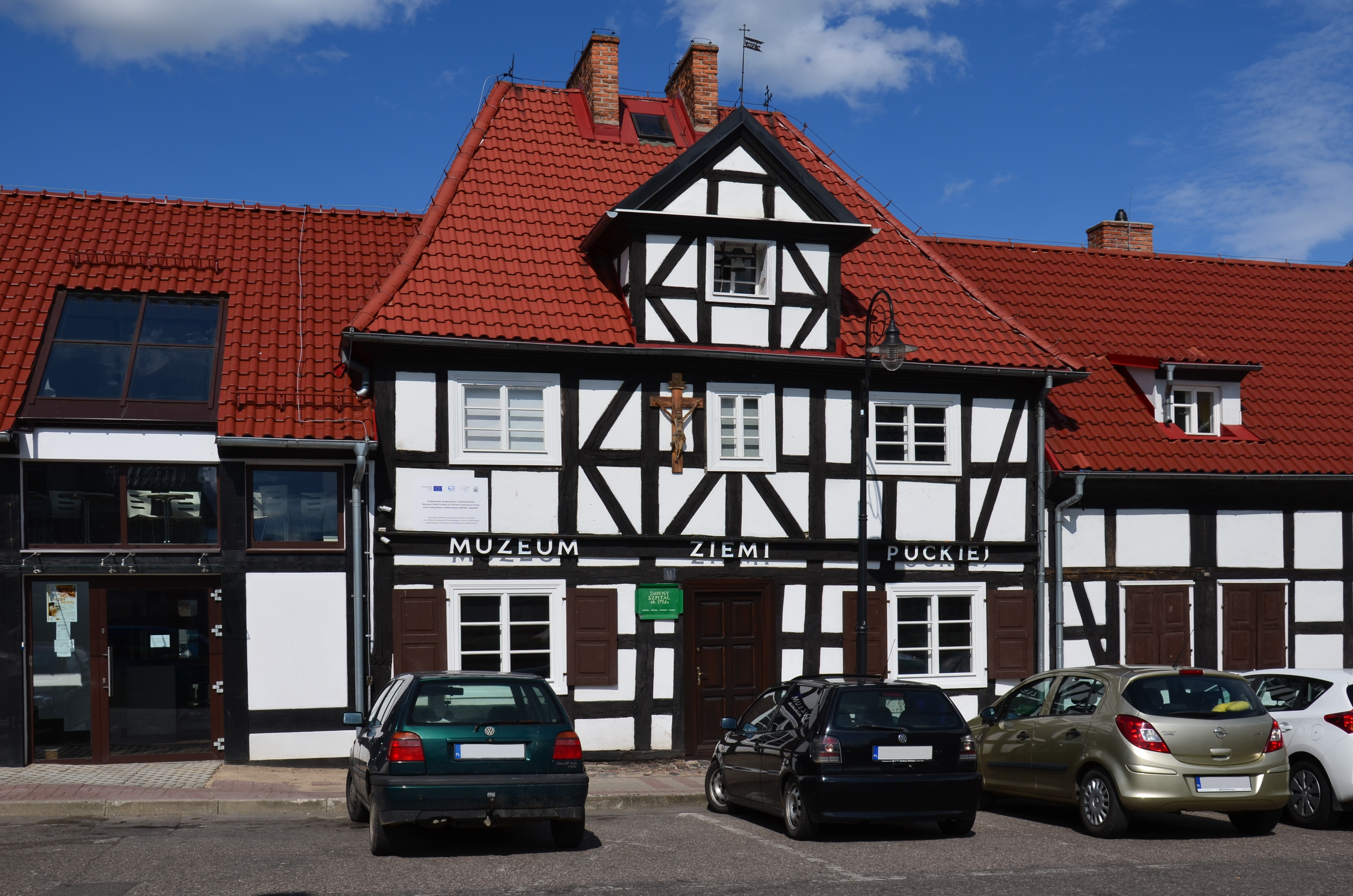
Ethnographic museum

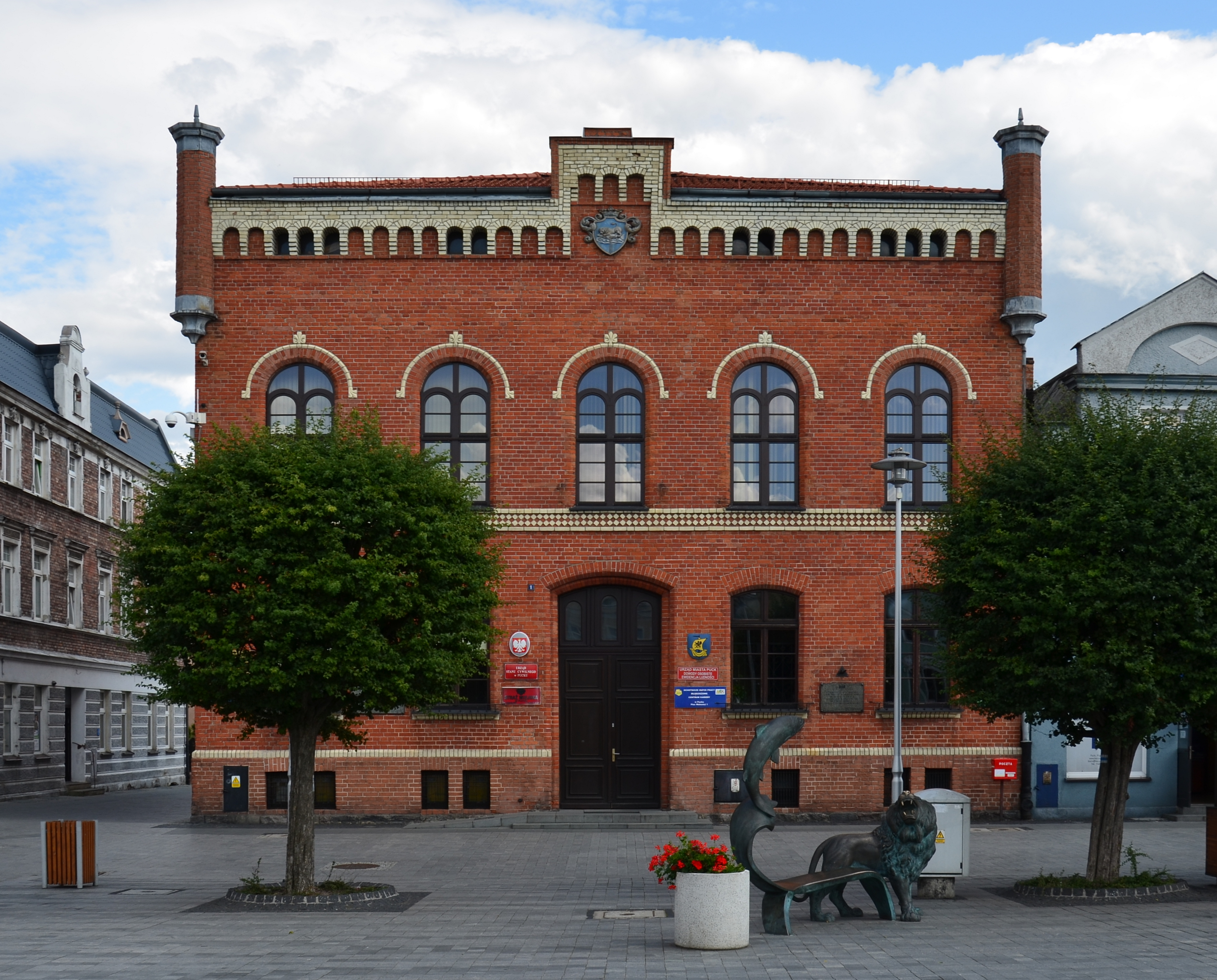
Puck Town Hall

- Gothic St Peter and Paul's church (13th century)
- Town Hall (1865)
- Burghers' houses at the old market square, 17th century, rebuilt in the 19th century
- Flooded port (8th-10th century) located some 500 metres from the shore
- Remnants of a brick castle (14th century)
- Memorials of gen. Józef Haller and Poland's Wedding to the Sea
- Puck region museum (Muzeum Ziemi Puckiej)
- Former 17th-century hospital, now housing an ethnographic museum
- Wooden pier
- Marina
- Caves in Mechowo
- Coastal Landscape Park (Nadmorski Park Krajobrazowy)

== Population ==
Year	Population
1895	1 904
1900	2 093
1960	6 800
1970	9 300
1975	10 500
1980	11 100
1998	11 600
2005	11 350

== Land use ==
Land use in Puck in 2005	in ha	in %
Total	490	100.0
agricultural lands area, of which:	188	38.4
arable land	118	24.1
orchards	0	0.0
meadows	59	12,0
pastures	11	2.2
Forests and forest land	3	0.6
Other and wastelands	299	61,0

== Sports ==
The local football team is Zatoka 95 Puck. It competes in the lower leagues.

== Notable residents ==
- Charles VIII of Sweden (1408–1470), lived in the town as a refugee in the 1460s.
- Heinrich Joseph Horwitz (1824–1899), German liberal politician
- Heinrich Edwin Rickert (1833–1902), German journalist and liberal politician
- Stanisław Jaskułka (born 1958) a retired Polish long jumper, came fifth with 8.13 metres at the 1980 Summer Olympics
- Daniel Pliński (born 1978) a former Polish volleyball player, a member of Poland men's national volleyball team from 2005 to 2010, competed in the 2008 Summer Olympics
- Sławek Jaskułke (born 1979), pianist, composer and arranger
- Marcin Wika (born 1983) a Polish volleyball player, a member of Poland men's national volleyball team from 2008 to 2009, competed in the 2008 Summer Olympics
- Jakub Biskup (born 1983) a Polish footballer, over 250 pro games
- Adam Łapeta (born 1987) a Polish professional basketball player

== International relations ==
Puck, Poland is twinned with:

Cieszyn, Southern Poland; Guéret, France; Naantali, Finland	Konz, Rhineland-Palatinate, Germany; Stein, Bavaria, Germany; Gura Humorului, Romania

== See also ==
- Hel
- Jastarnia
- Amber Road
