= Charles François Gand =

French violin maker

- Born: 1787; Versailles, France
- Died: 1845 (aged 57–58); Paris, France
- Occupation: Violin maker

Charles François Gand (1787–1845) was one of the foremost violin makers/luthier and dealers of his time.

Known as Gand Père, Charles François Gand was the son and pupil of Charles Michel Gand, a violin maker who was living in Mirecourt around 1750, before coming to Versailles in 1780.

Charles Francois first worked with Nicolas Lupot from 1802 to 1810, then joined his father's workshop (some of the instruments from this period are labeled as made between 1807 and 1816). At the death of his father in 1820, Charles François Gand took over the workshop of Jean Gabriel Koliker at 24 rue Croix-des-Petits-Champs in Paris. He married Nicolas Lupot's adopted daughter and succeeded Lupot in 1824.

Charles François Gand is considered as one of the important French violin makers. His instruments are typical of the French school of this period and the finest examples are very much influenced by Lupot. They are bold and powerful, coated with a rich red-brown or orange-brown varnish on a golden/yellow ground. His collaborators in the shop included: Auguste Sebastien Bernardel, Georges Chanot (1821), Joseph Louis Germain (1840–1845) and Pierre Silvestre (1824–1829). At Charles François Gand's death in 1845, his son and pupil, Charles Adolphe Gand, succeeded him.

Gand was appointed luthier to the Royal Court of France and Paris Conservatoire. He completed a set of instruments begun by Lupot for the Royal Orchestra, but most of them were destroyed in a fire at the Tuileries in 1871. Charles Francois Gand is ranked as a serious rival to both Nicolas Lupot and Jean-Baptiste Vuillaume as a luthier. His work is superb and mainly on the Stradivari models.

== Honors and awards ==
- Luthier de la Musique du Roi (Luthier of the King's Music)
- Luthier de l'Ecole Royale de Musique (Luthier of the Royal School of Music)
- Luthier du Conservatoire Royal de Musique (Luthier of the Royal Music Conservatory)
