= Nicolas François Vuillaume =

French luthier (1802 - 1876)

- Born: 1802; Mirecourt, France
- Died: 1876 (aged 73–74); Brussels, Belgium
- Education: Claude François Vuillaume
- Known for: Luthier
- Style: Maggini, Stradivarius
- Movement: Mirecourt school
- Awards: Medal 1831 London Expo; Medal 1835 Brussels Exhibitions; Silver Medal 1841 Brussels Exhibitions; Medal First Class 1855 Paris Expo; Medal 1867 Dublin Expo; Medal 1873 Vienna Expo
- Elected: Luthier of Royal Conservatory of Brussels (1836)

Nicolas François Vuillaume (1802–1876) was an important French luthier of the Vuillaume family, and younger brother of the illustrious Jean-Baptiste Vuillaume. He ran the leading workshop in Brussels, Belgium, and was appointed instrument maker to the Royal Conservatory in Brussels. His instruments won a number of medals at exhibitions.

== Biography ==
Nicholas François Vuillaume (NFV) was born in Mirecourt, Vosges, in 1802, the fourth of five sons to Claude-François Vuillaume. The Vuillaume family had been luthiers in Mirecourt for several generations. Millant traces a family tree, identifying "for sure" a great-great-grandfather Claude-Francois Vuillaume (born about 1700). There is a legendary ancestor, one Jean Vuillaume, who was supposedly a pupil of Stradivari, but this remains a legend, and perhaps was invented as a joke. Most of the Vuillaume family were destined to become instrument makers, the most famous being NFV's elder brother, the second son Jean-Baptiste Vuillaume (JBV) who became perhaps France's pre-eminent maker and dealer in stringed instruments.

J.B. Vuillaume moved to Paris at the age of 19, where he worked first in the workshops of François Chanot and Lete, and joining them in partnership before finally setting up his own. NFV, like his other siblings, joined his brother business in Paris, and initially made instruments that were labeled J B Vuillaume. While in Paris NFV quickly gained a reputation for producing outstanding instruments.

With an elder brother of the stature of J.B. Vuillaume, N.F. Vuillaume took perhaps the only course of action open to him in seeking to establish himself as a maker and dealer in his own right – he moved to set up his own establishment in Brussels, Belgium. (Millant gives this date as 1820, but 1830 seems more likely given the limited number of his named instruments dating from this period.) Though he owned his own shop, NFV continued to make instruments for JBV, and as JBV's business grew rapidly, NFV was his first choice for work. Examples attributed to NFV as late as 1857 imply that he continued to supply instruments to JBV in addition to those made in his brother's substantial workshop. This convenient arrangement may explain that it took until the year 1833 for NFV to label the 41st instrument in his own name.

Over the next few years N.F. Vuillaume sold instruments in his own name at a rate of around 10 a year. Away from the shadow of his brother, NFV flourished and by 1836 had been appointed instrument maker to the Royal Conservatory of Music in Brussels. NFV won a clutch of medals at various exhibitions, including the Medal de Vermeil in 1841 and the Medal First Class at the Universal Exposition in Paris in 1855. In 1873 he was appointed Chevalier to the Order of Leopold. In terms of violin making, Belgium and the Vuillaume family is part of the French School, and for a time the two Vuillaume brothers were the pre-eminent figures in France and Belgium.

Over his working life, N.F. Vuillaume produced in excess of 340 instruments bearing his label, and an unknown number under his brother's label. Millant notes that in 1823, JBV started the unusual practice of numbering his instruments - and that Gand and Bernadel adopted the same practice, as did NFV. NFV's instruments are typically branded or signed on the underside of the table with instrument number and date and labeled. In his earlier years he appears to have favoured instruments in the style of Giovanni Paolo Maggini, while later on he moved more towards Stradivari models.

Initially he may have operated largely on his own, but as his workshop became established he employed a number of craftsmen who were top makers in their own right including three members of the Darche family—Charles Francois, Hilaire and Nicholas (who subsequently set up own shop in Aachen)—as well as Jean Baptiste Collin-Mezin (prior to setting up his own establishment in Paris in 1867).

N.F. Vuillaume operated as a dealer as well as maker and, though never approaching his brother's legendary cache of Cremonese instruments, records on Cozio indicate that the Stradivari cello "General Kyd" (1684) was bought by N.F. Vuillaume in 1857, and that the Matteo Grofriller cello "ex-Muller" (1710) and the "Cessole" Stradivari violin of 1715 also passed through his hands. The Hill brothers tell that after the death of J.B. Vuillaume in 1875, "Le Messie" (the Messiah) Stradivari violin was offered to NFV for the price of 12,000 francs, but the offer was refused.

Before his death in 1876, N.F. Vuillaume's business and title as "Luthier du Conservatorie Royal de Musique Bruxelles" had been taken on by Georges Mougenot. For a number of years afterwards, at least as late as 1885, instruments bearing NFV labels were still produced from his workshop.

A double bass by Georges Mougenot labeled from 1875, the year he took over the shop of NFV in Brussels, reads as the "Royal Maker of Liege". This double bass is a Vuillaume model but with a Mougenot label from Liege.

== Honour ==
- Chevalier de l’Ordre de Léopold (Chevalier to the Order of Leopold) (Belgium, 1873)
