= Sławek Jaskułke =

Polish pianist, composer and bandleader (born 1979)

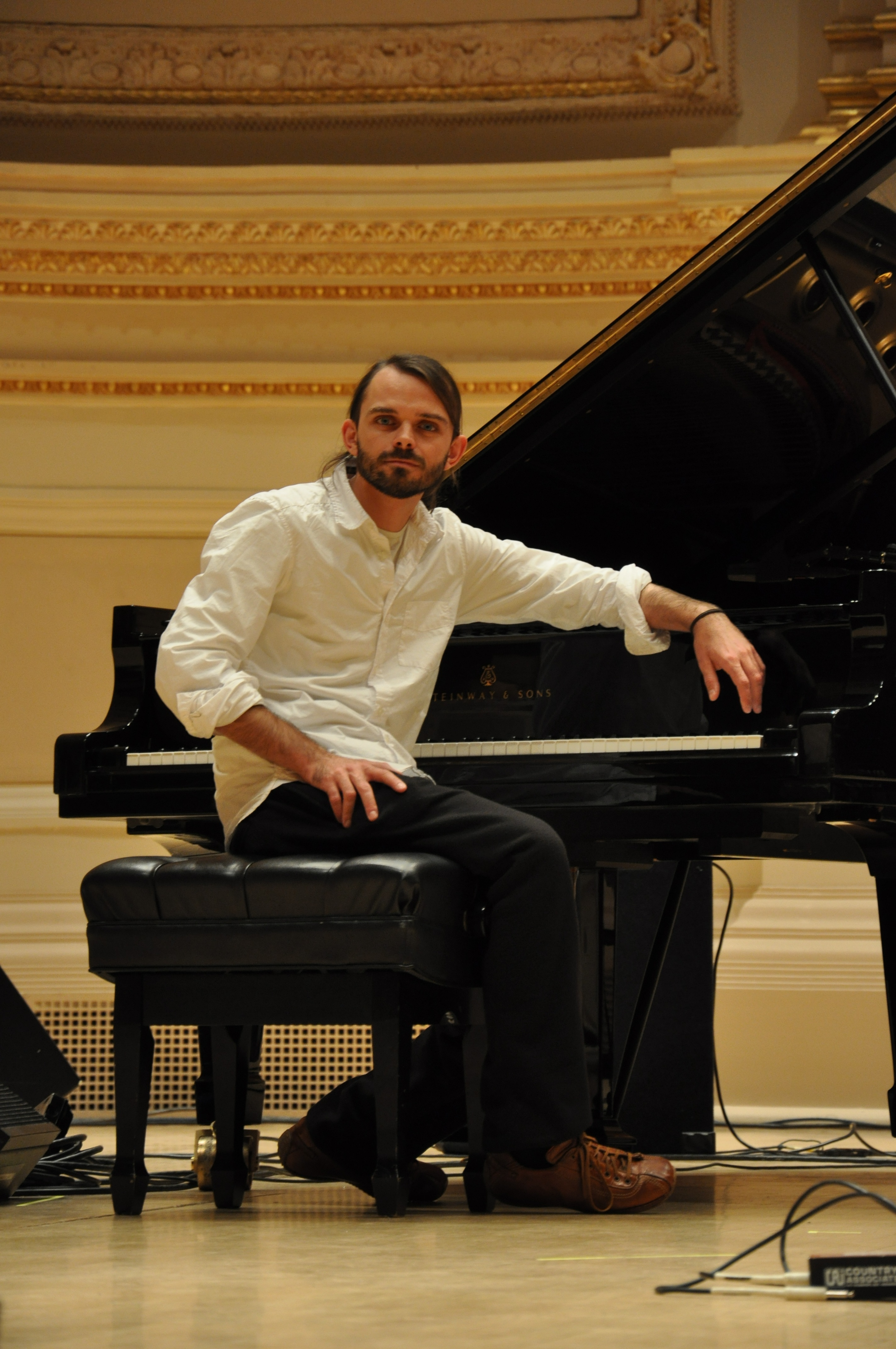
- Sławek Jaskułke in Carnegie Hall (2010)

Background information
- Birth name: Sławomir Jaskułke
- Born: 2 January 1979 (age 46); Puck, Poland
- Genres: Jazz
- Occupation(s): Musician, composer, arranger, record producer
- Instrument: Piano
- Website: jaskulke.com

Sławek Jaskułke (born 2 January 1979) is a Polish pianist, composer and bandleader. He is also an arranger, record producer, and a member of Zbigniew Namysłowski Quintet. He has composed piano, orchestra, theatre, and film music.

== Career ==
Jaskułke has performed at Carnegie Hall in New York City, Symphony Hall in Chicago, Munich Philharmonic, and the Moscow International Performing Arts Center, the North Sea Jazz Festival, Berlin Jazz Fest, Red Sea Jazz Festival, Padova Jazz Festival, Garana International Jazz Festival, and the Jazz Jamboree. He has performed in dozens of countries around the world and on almost all continents. In 2006 he represented Poland at the Music Beyond Borders Festival in Hong Kong, which resulted with recording an album Jaskułke – Hong Kong. In September 2010 he appeared at the World Expo in Shanghai, presenting a premiere of Jaskułke – Chopin for Five Pianos.

He has worked with Petr Cancura, Furio di Castri, Krzesimir Dębski, Urszula Dudziak, David Fiuczynski, L.U.C, Janusz Muniak, David Murray, Adam Pierończyk, Tomasz Szukalski, Tymon Tymanski, Michał Urbaniak, and Eric Vloeimans.

Among his most important awards are: Pegaz – Polish TV award for musical achievements, Jazz Oscar of Music Lovers Association in Łódź, he was a nominee for Fryderyk – Polish Phonographic Industry Award for Jazz Musician of the Year and Jazz Album of the Year for Jaskułke - Fill the Harmony Philharmonics with Cameral Orchestra Hanseatica.

== Discography ==
- Sławek Jaskułke, Moments
- Jaskułke & Wyleżoł, DuoDram
- Sławek Jaskułke, Hong Kong
- Jaskułke & Hanseatica Chamber Orchestra, Fill The Harmony Philharmonics
- Sławek Jaskułke, 3yo, Sugarfree
- Sławek Jaskułke, Live from Gdynia Summer Jazz Days 2001
- Zbigniew Namysłowski, Nice & Easy
- Zbigniew Namysłowski, Assymetry
- Zbigniew Namysłowski, Standards
- Przemek Dyakowski, Melisa
- Wojtek Staroniewicz, Alternations
- Jacek Kochan, Yearning
- Jacek Kochan, Double life of a chair
- Jerzy Małek, Bop beat
- Pink Freud, Sorry Music Polska
- Pink Freud, Jazz fajny jest (remix & live)
- Sowiński & The Collective, llustrations
- Emil Kowalski Plaing Benny Goodman
- Piotr Zastróżny Album. Live in studio
- Cezary Paciorek, Shalom
- Novika, Tricks of life
- Waldek Chyliński, Słowa
- Bassisters Orchestra, 2002
- Psalmy - Artyści polscy Janowi Pawłowi II w hołdzie
