= Nicolas Lupot =

French luthier (1758 - 1824)

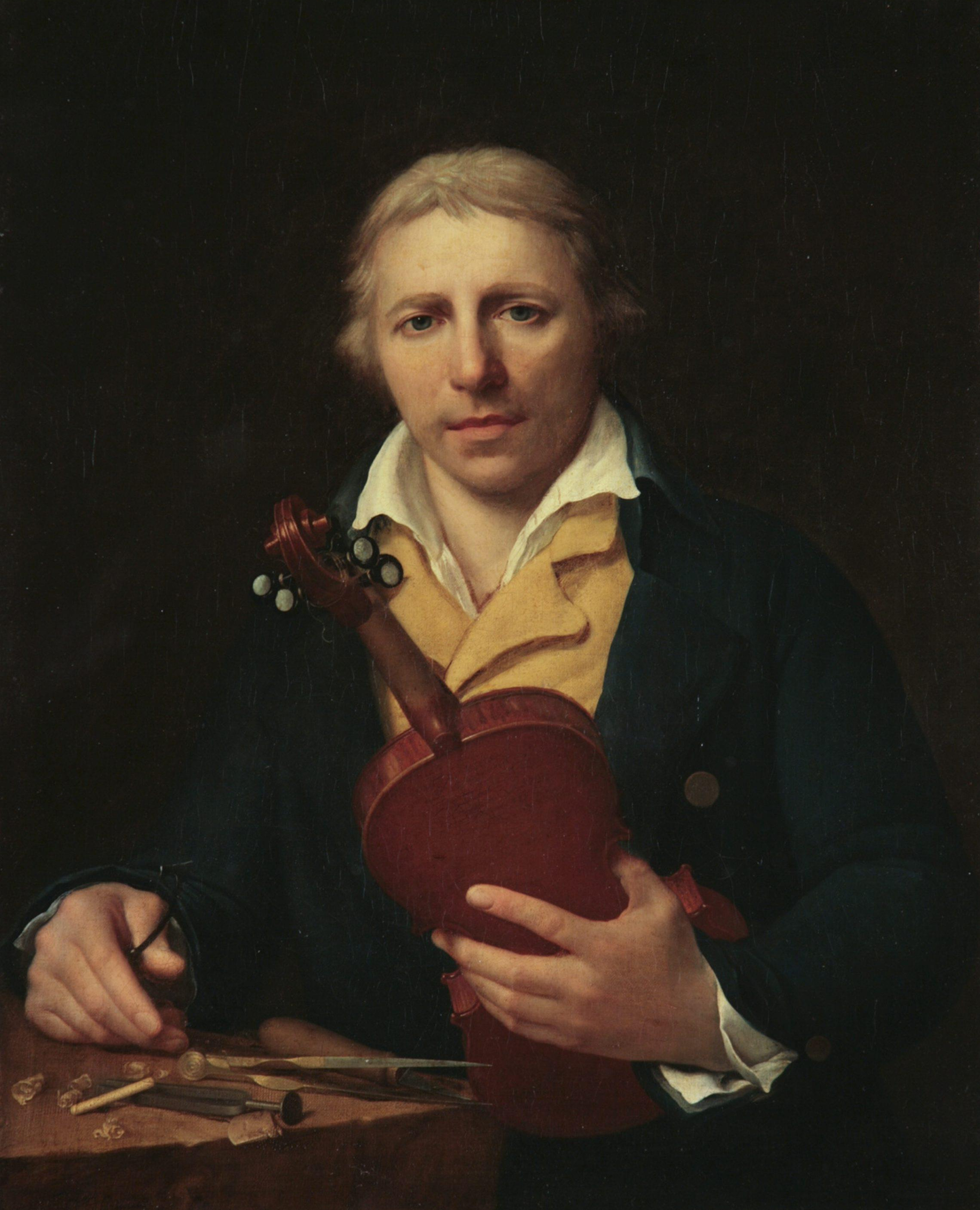
Portrait of Nicolas Lupot by Henriette Lorimier, 1805

Nicolas Lupot (4 December 1758 – 14 August 1824) was one of the most illustrious French luthiers (violin makers) of his time.

Lupot was born in Stuttgart. He was apprenticed to his father and worked in Orléans until 1794. Soon after, he moved to Paris, where he was appointed violin maker to the king (1815), and to the Conservatoire of Paris (1816). This latter post involved furnishing instruments (of the whole violin family) awarded to first-prize winners.

Lupot was ordered by King Louis XVIII to make an orchestra of stringed instruments which were to be decorated/embellished with the coat of arms of France. He ambitiously undertook in 1820 to replace all the instruments of the royal orchestra with new ones of his own make, but death in 1824 prevented him from fulfilling this plan.

He modelled most of his instruments (except a few after Guarnerius and Amati) after those of Stradivarius. This is why there is a variety in his productions - some of broad proportions, others standard and some under the recognized full sizes.

Lupot died in Paris, aged 65.

== Quotes ==
He frequently received the title of "The French Stradivarius" and in Mirecourt there is a street named after him.

The Dictionnaire Universel del Luthiers states: "Lupot was an important French maker, modeling his instruments after Stradivari."

"The first violin maker of the family was his grandfather Laurent Lupot (baptised in Mirecourt, 11 August 1696; died in Orléans, after 1762). He worked in Plombières (near Epinal) about 1725, then in Lunéville for Stanisław Leszczyński's court from 1738 to 1756, and finally in Orléans from 1762 until his death. His eldest son, François (i) (born in Plombières, 5 July 1725; died in Paris, 25 August 1805), Nicolas' father, left Lunéville to work in Germany as violin maker to the Duke of Württemberg. He settled in Stuttgart, where Nicolas was born, then in Ludwigsburg. In 1768 he returned to France and joined his father in Orléans, where he opened his own workshop and acquired the sobriquet François Lupot d'Orléans."

"Although the work of Stradivari was Lupot's guide, he was anything but a slavish copyist. What he did grasp as well as any Stradivari follower was incomparable good taste in workmanship; within this discipline he gave expression to his own admirable ideas, as described by Sibire (1806). His rich orange-red varnish, perfectly transparent, gave the final touch. Occasionally he copied Guarneri del Gesù, whose violins were rapidly achieving fame in the first two decades of the 19th century. Lupot's production was almost entirely of violins; violas and cellos are a rarity. The aristocratic tonal qualities of his instruments have always been well appreciated by players. Lupot's most important pupil was Charles François Gand, who also became his successor through having married a young girl that Lupot considered as his adopted daughter. Another was Sébastien-Philippe Bernardel. Lupot's influence was strongly felt in Paris throughout the 19th century; above all, he created the standard by which the rest of the great French school is judged." – Charles Beare/Sylvette Milliot

"Jean-Baptiste Vuillaume achieved recognition as the greatest technical genius of his time, surpassed in French violin making only by Nicholas Lupot." – Smithsonian Institution

"N. Lupot instruments especially those made in his mature period in Paris, are simply superb" – Gennady Filimonov

"...the king of French artists, Nicolas Lupot." – The Violin – Its Famous Makers and Their Imitators by George Hart, 1909

"Lupot is known to have set the bar in workmanship and tone for the French in the 19th century." – Antonio Strad Violin

"The Lupot family are claimed as natives of Mirecourt, although the greatest of them, Nicolas, whose violins run some of the finest specimens of Cremona very hard, was a native of Stuttgart. His father was a Frenchman and came from Mirecourt. All his traditions belong to Mirecourt, and these, as we all know, he carried with him to Paris, where he died in 1824, and was succeeded by Gand. The names of Maucotel, Medard, Mennegand, Silvestre, and Derazay, and above all Vuillaume, must always shed an imperishable lustre upon the little town in the Vosges mountains." - Old Violins and Violin Lore by H. R. Haweis.
