= Jérôme Thibouville-Lamy =

French musical instrument making company

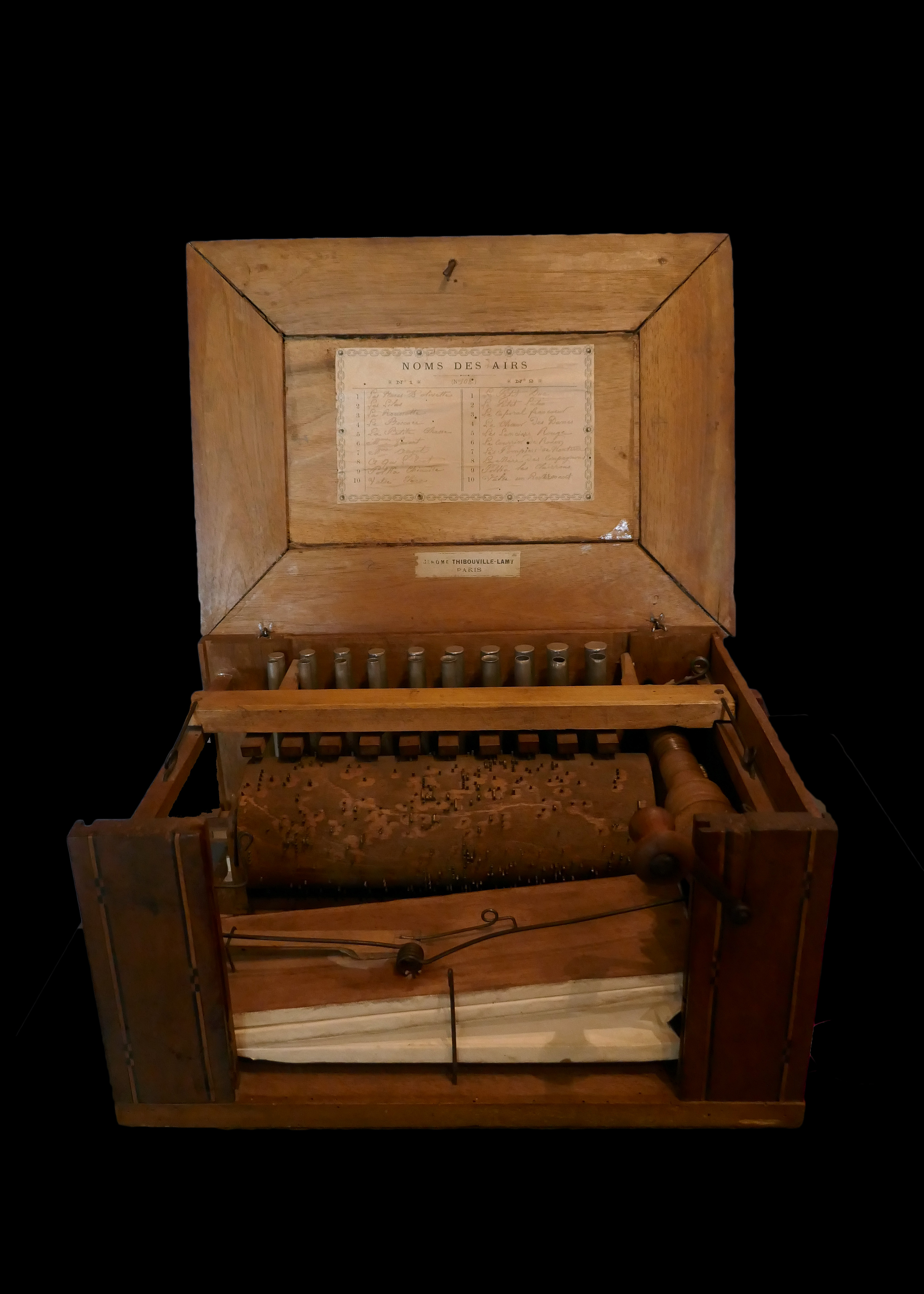
fr:Merline made by Jérôme Thibouville-Lamy.

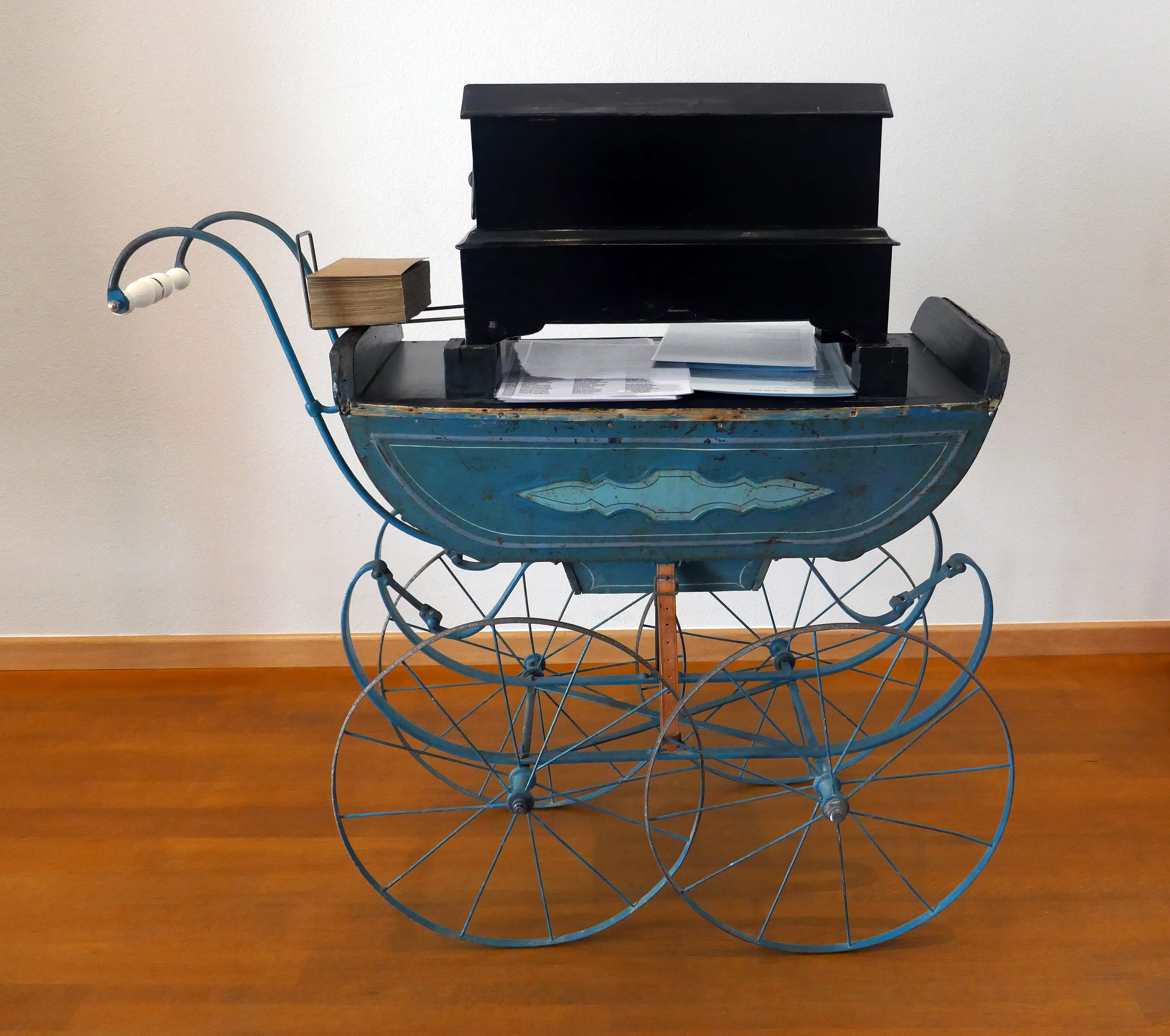
Organina by Jérôme Thibouville-Lamy, ca. 1887.

Jérôme Thibouville-Lamy & Cie, abbreviated as "J.T.L.", was a French musical instrument making company, formed in the mid 19th century from the merger of pre-existing makers.

It was based in Mirecourt, France, and was active producing large numbers of woodwind, brass and stringed instruments until the mid 20th century. The company also made large numbers of mechanical organs and organettes between 1880 and 1910. Some of these models were made with license of the Gavioli company.

The name was adopted around 1867 after Louis Émile Jérôme Thibouville, a partner in the instrument maker Husson-Buthod-Thibouville, married Marguerite Hyacinthe Lamy, a cousin of his business partners, and upon becoming owner of the firm he renamed it using their combined names: Jérôme Thibouville-Lamy.

Thibouville was descendant of a line of woodwind and brass instrument makers dating back to the 16th Century. However, he was primarily an entrepreneur who was keen to develop a business in stringed instruments, and was not himself a luthier or bow-maker. The company grew quickly, and at its peak it reached annual production rates of over 150,000 instruments produced by more than 1,000 luthiers.

In 1896 Alfred Acoulon joined the firm to take in charge the production of the instruments. In 1908 Hugues-Emile Blondelet, a violin maker from Mirecourt joined as co-director. Jérôme Thibouville-Lamy shut its doors in 1969.

== Labels ==
List of names used in Jérôme Thibouville-Lamy trade instruments.

- Alfred Acoulon
- Joseph Aubrey
- Geronimo Barnabetti
- Emile Blondelet
- Breton
- Charles Buthod
- Compagnon
- Nicolas Duchêne
- Médio-Fino
- Le Parisiene
- Louis Fricot
- Michel Ange Garini
- Mansuy
- A. Salvator
- Salzard
- Thiéry
- Nicolas Bertolini
- Le célèbre vosgien

== See also ==
- Laberte-Humbert Frères
- Jean-Baptiste Vuillaume
