= Sharon Que =

American artist

- Sharon Que with one of her public sculptures
- Born: May 18, 1960 (age 66); Detroit, Michigan
- Website: sharonque.com

Sharon Que (Querciagrossa) (born May 18, 1960 in Detroit, Michigan) is an American visual artist and luthier, based in Ann Arbor, specializing in violin restoration and repair.

It has been said that much of Que’s imagery can be perceived as multilayers, with some forms suggesting a mix of spiritual, secular, and mathematical or even industrial significance.

Some of her sculptures are also owned by important American institutions and are in public spaces, including the Detroit Institute of Arts.

Being involved with music, since March 2007, she has been a curator of the exhibit "Instrumental", at the Ann Arbor Gallery Project, featuring artists who are engaged in industrial design, engineering, music, acoustics, math, violin and bow making.

Sculpture: Constructed, March 24 to May 16, 2008, at Gallery One, Washtenaw Community College, Ann Arbor featured some of her works together with some of Tom Phardel, as done by Lemberg Gallery Summer Mix (Jul 12 - Aug 9, 2008), with her Survival Engine.

== Solo exhibitions ==
- 2005: Automatic Desires, Museo ItaloAmericano, Fort Mason Center, San Francisco, CA
- 2003: Retrofit, Meadow Brook Art Gallery, Oakland University, Rochester, MI
- 2003: Immersed, Byron Roche Gallery, Chicago, IL
- 2001: Loop, Lemberg Gallery, Ferndale, MI
- 1999: Concentric Chronology, Warren Robbins Gallery, University of Michigan, Ann Arbor, MI
- 1999: Seamless Motion, G.R. N'Namdi Gallery, Chicago, IL
- 1996: Every distance is not near, Alexa Lee Gallery, Ann Arbor, MI
- 1996: Sharon Que: Sculpture, General Motors Institute Gallery, General Motors Institute, Flint, MI
- 1993: Sculpture, Gallery 414, Ann Arbor, MI
- 1992: New Sculpture, Robert Kidd Gallery, Birmingham, MI
- 1989: Sharon Que, Sculpture and Mixed Media Assembleges, Fine Arts Gallery, Mott Community College, Flint, MI

== Group exhibitions ==
- 2010: Wanderlust, Lemberg Gallery (Mar 6 - Apr 24) with Diane Carr and Janet Hamrick (see )
- 2009: Detroit International Auto Show, Ford Motor Company, Lincoln.
- 2008: Summer Mix, Lemberg Gallery (Jul 12 - Aug 9) with Survival Engine
- 2008: Spirit, featuring artists able to express the interior space of the soul, Gallery Project, Ann Arbor, MI, June 25 to August 3, 2008.
- 2008: Sculpture: Constructed, Gallery One, Washtenaw Community College, Ann Arbor (March 24 - May 16)
- 2007: Instrumental, Ann Arbor Gallery Project (March)
- 2003: Art Chicago 2003, Navy Pier, Byron Roche Gallery, Chicago IL
- 2002: Biennial 2002, Detroit Artists Market, Detroit, MI
- 2000: Art Chicago 2000, Navy Pier, Byron Roche Gallery, Chicago IL
- 2000: Parallel Tracks, Bobbitt Visual Arts Center, Albion College, Albion, MI (Tom Phardel)
- 1999: 3d@dc, Detroit Contemporary, Detroit, MI
- 1999: Duty Free, Artcite, Windsor, Canada
- 1999: Dysfunctional Sculpture, Center Galleries, Center for Creative Studies, Detroit, MI
- 1998: Great Lakes Regional Art Exhibition, Midland Center for Arts, Midland, MI (Juror's Merit Award)
- 1997: Ambient Luminosity, Detroit Artists Market, Detroit, MI
- 1996: Out of Solitude, Tribes of the Corridor, Michigan Gallery (Sept. 7 - Oct. 12) http://corridortribe.com/tribes/michigan_gallery_tribe/solitude_090796.htm
- 1996: Sharon Que, Robert Bielat, Ken Thompson, Marygrove College Gallery, Marygrove College, Detroit, MI
- 1996: Patrimonio: The Legacy of Italian Art in Michigan, Community Arts Gallery, Wayne State University, Detroit, MI
- 1993: Group Show, Gallery d'Arte UBU, Venice, Italy
- 1993: Sculpture, Willis Gallery, Detroit, MI (Robert Hansen)
- 1992: Spiritual Concerns in Contemporary Art, Lee Hall Gallery, Northern Michigan University, Marquette, MI
- 1991: Four Sculptors, University Art Gallery, Central Michigan University, Mt. Pleasant, MI
- 1990: The Poetics of Space: The Box and New Assemblages, curated by Ben Mitchell, Art Center of Battle Creek, Battle Creek, MI (Traveling Exhibition).
- 1989: After Ten Years, Detroit Focus Gallery, Detroit, MI
- 1989: Sculpture, Michigan Gallery, Detroit, MI (Tom Phardel)
- 1988: Artists Choose Artists, Detroit Focus Gallery, Detroit, MI
- 1987: Sharon Que, Mary Ann Jordan, Michigan Gallery, Detroit, MI
- 1987: Assemblages, Ann Arbor Art Association, Ann Arbor, MI (Grace Ann Warn)

== Violinmaking activity ==
- 2001: she opened her own workshop after a long apprenticeship as violin making assistant at Curtin and Alf and with Joe Curtin.
- 2006: she became a member of the American Federation of Violin and Bow Makers after specializing with violin restorer Hans Nebel, from the school of Simone Fernando Sacconi.
- 2009: contribution to The Pau-Brasil Conservation Project.
- 2019: member of the International Society of violin and bow makers (EILA)
