= Joshua Coyne =

American musician & composer (born 1993)

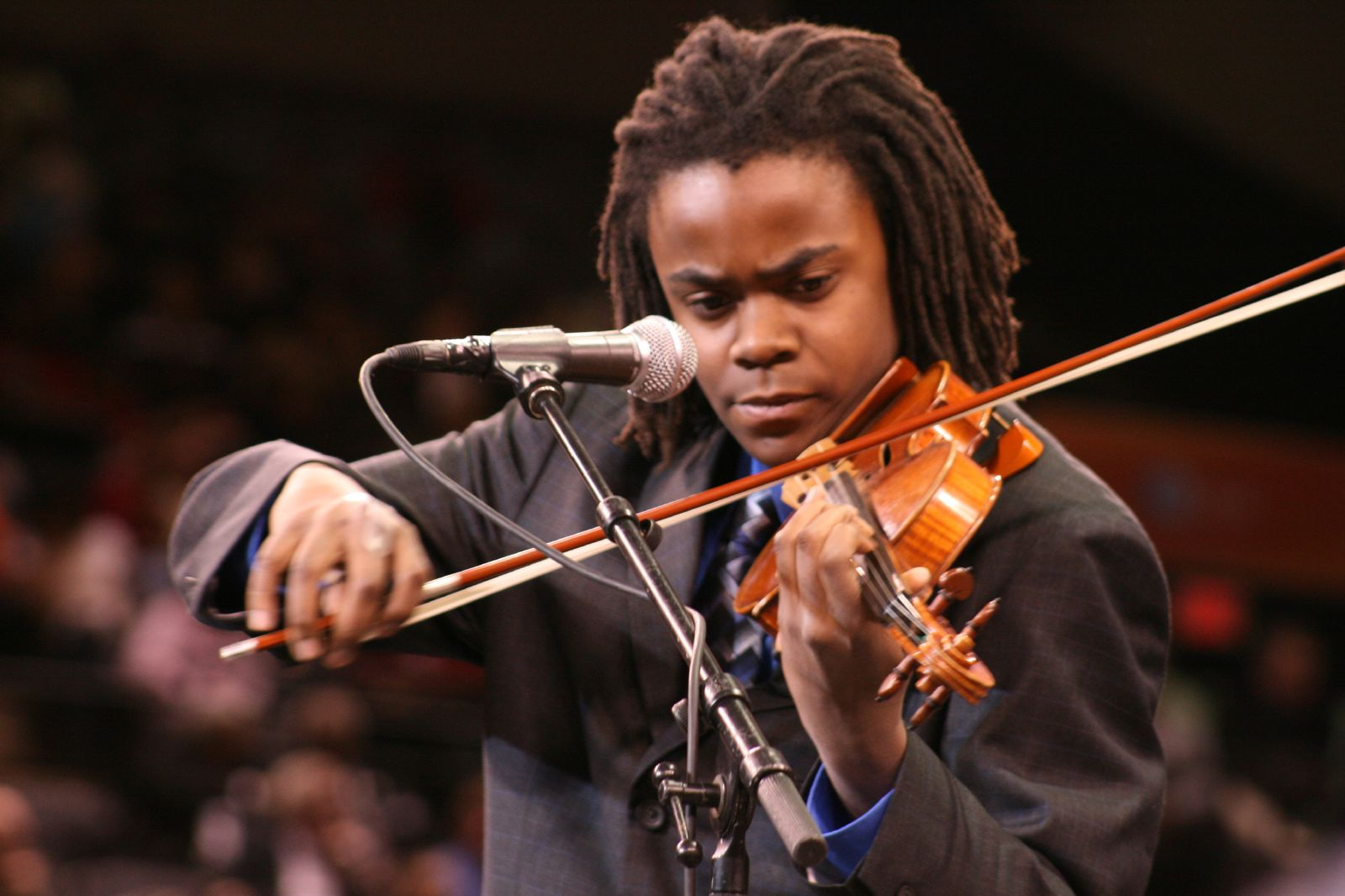
- Joshua Coyne playing at Barack Obama's Rally for Change

Background information
- Born: March 5, 1993 (age 33)
- Genres: Classical, Jazz, Contemporary
- Occupations: Composer, Violinist, Conductor
- Instruments: Violin, Piano, Viola
- Website: MusicManJosh

Joshua Coyne (born March 5, 1993) is an American musician and composer.

== Personal biography ==
Joshua was born in Kansas City, Missouri, on March 5, 1993. He was adopted at the age of two and moved to Cedar Rapids, Iowa. The Coyne family was involved in the local arts community, participating at Theatre Cedar Rapids and the Cedar Rapids Symphony. Joshua quickly expressed interest and aptitude in music and took his first lessons at the Cedar Rapids Symphony School. In 2006, Joshua and some of his family moved to the Washington, D.C. area, where he continued his violin studies with Lya Stern and began composition study.

After moving to D.C., Joshua performed for then candidate Barack Obama at the Stand for Change Rally in February 2008, as well as for the Haitian Embassy.

Coyne composed the score to Anne and Emmett, a play about Emmett Till and Anne Frank written by Janet Langhart Cohen. The premiere of the play was to be held at the United States Holocaust Memorial Museum on June 10, 2009, but was canceled due to a shooting earlier that day.

In the summer of 2011, Joshua was the subject of a series of articles describing the difficulties students may have getting scholarships, loans, and grants, to be able to afford college. As a result of these articles, Joshua received numerous donations which allowed him to attend Manhattan School of Music.

Joshua plays on a custom bow by Joshua Henry, and a violin he named "Lya" for his teacher, made by Joseph Curtin.

Coyne is the co-subject of a documentary film entitled Sonata Mulattica, which will compare his life with the life of George Bridgetower based on the collection of poems of the same name, written by poet laureate Rita Dove.

== Education ==
- Violin instruction by Lya Stern, herself a student of Jascha Heifetz and Raphael Bronstein, who were in turn students of Leopold Auer
- Composition instruction from Judah Adashi at Peabody Institute
- Composition instruction from Joel Hoffman, chair of the composition department at the College Conservatory of Music at the University of Cincinnati
- Composition mentor Marvin Hamlisch
- Graduated from Winston Churchill High School (Potomac, Maryland)
- Conservatory students accepted in 2011 into the Manhattan School of Music composition department, studying under Robert Sirota and Richard Danielpour

== Notable accomplishments ==
=== Performances ===
- Performed for 13,000 at Barack Obama's Rally for Change
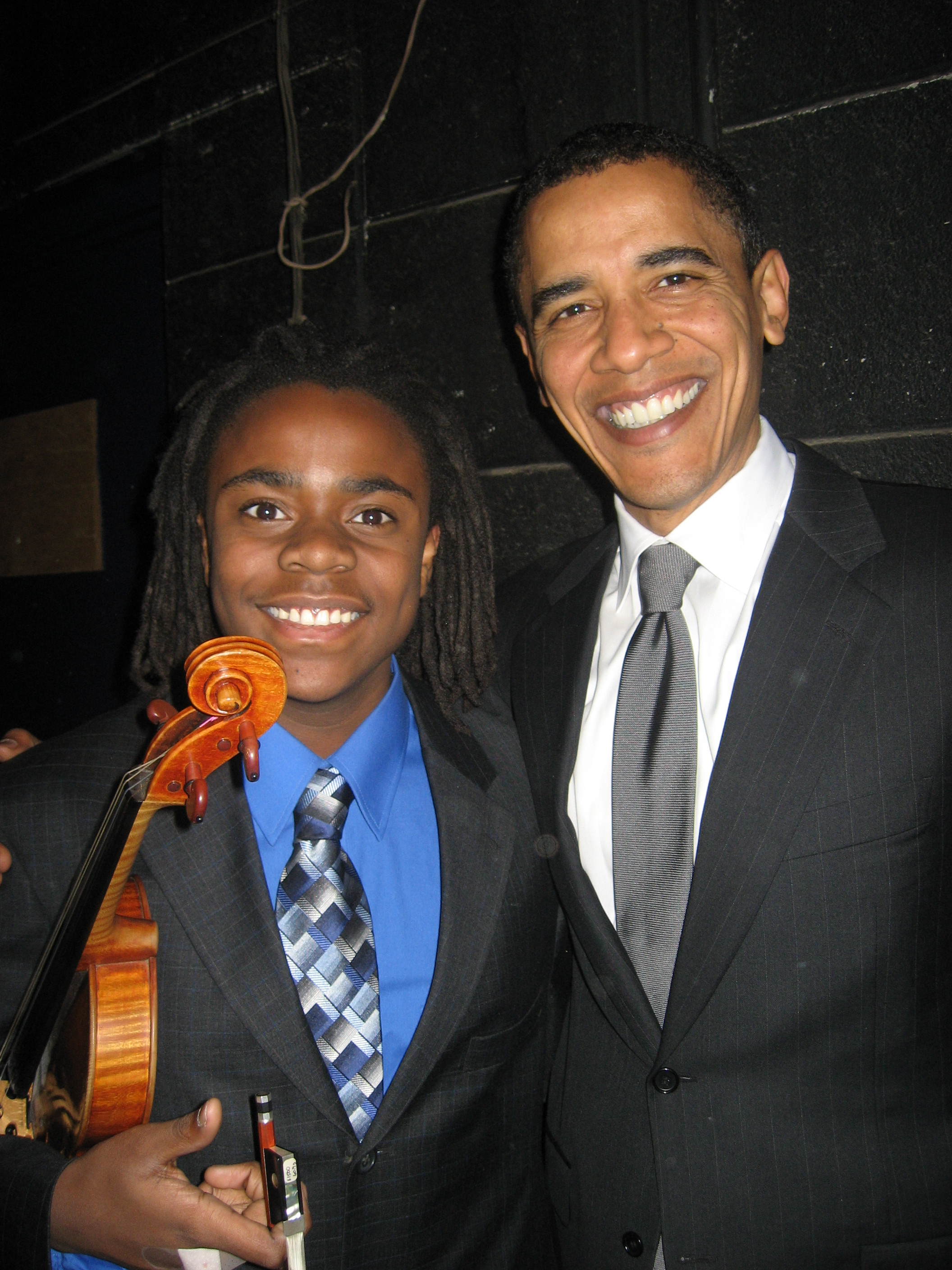
- Performed the role of Tom Collins in Rent at the 2009 American High School Theatre Festival in Edinburgh, Scotland
- Performed a solo concert at the Kennedy Center Millennium Stage

=== Compositions ===
- Composed the score for Anne and Emmett, a play by Janet Langhart Cohen about Emmett Till and Anne Frank
- Daydream, a composition which won Gold at the NAACP Afro-Academic, Cultural, Technological and Scientific Olympics.
- Composed True Love, a three-movement ballet

=== Awards ===
- Named one of Bethesda Magazine's 2011 Top Teens
- NAACP ACTSO Gold
- Discus Awards scholarship winner

=== Other ===
- Subject of an article describing the difficulties students may have getting funding for college.
