= Soroku Murata =

Japanese violinmaker (1927–2020)

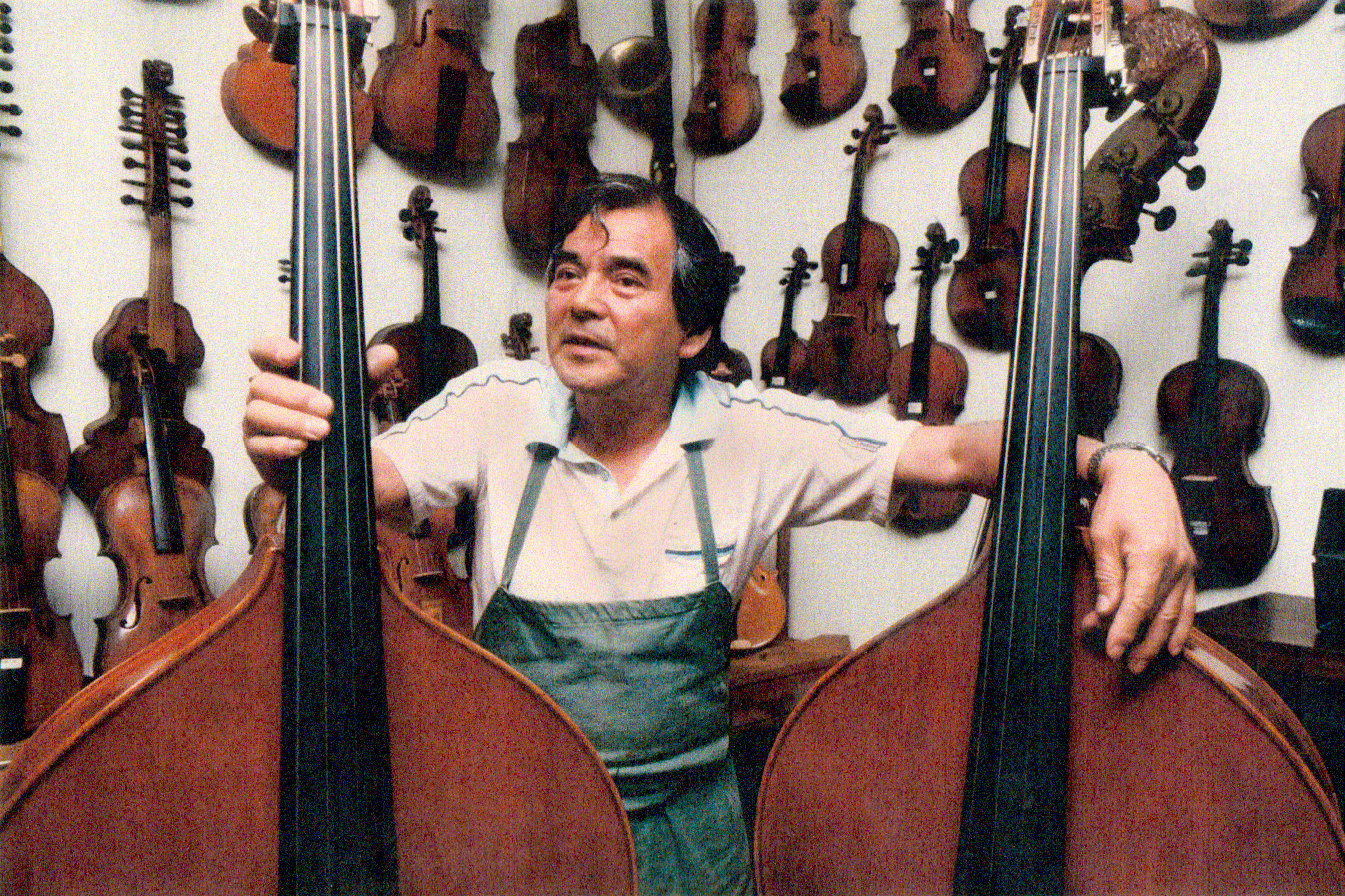

Soroku Murata (Japanese 無量塔 蔵六; real name Shōichirō Murata, Japanese 村田 昭一郎; * March 4, 1927, in Tokyo, † January 30, 2020, ibidem) was the first Japanese violinmaker with a German master craftsman’s diploma.

== Life ==
Soroku Murata was born on March 4, 1927, in Oi-machi, Ebara-gun in Tokyo. He graduated from Dokkyō Junior High School in the 55th class.

To avoid being drafted during World War II, he joined his uncle as a factory worker. On the job, he showed his talent for manual craftsmanship and was therefore assigned to metal casting. After the war ended, he became a member of the Kyoto Opera Company Orchestra in 1947, the Shimbashi Florida Dance Hall in 1949, and of the Hospital Orchestra at the American Army Officers' Club. However, due to the professional musicians returning from the war service, he lost his employments.

In 1951 he became self-taught in violin making as well as repair. He learned the professional use of tools from Mitsugu Ōta, a woodworker at the time who later specialized in crafting piano soundboards.

In 1955, he joined Noboru Nagasako's study group at the Tokyo Institute of Technology to study acoustics for violin making. In 1962, with the support of Nagasako and Alfred Leicht, a violin maker from Berlin as guarantor, he enrolled in the Staatliche Musikinstrumentenbauschule Mittenwald, Bavaria. As the first Japanese, Murata passed the master craftsman violin making examination in 1963, and subsequently returned to Japan in 1964.

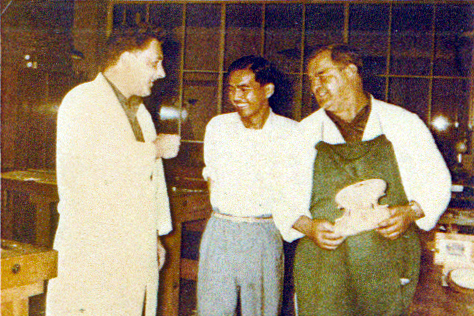
Murata (center) with Karl Roy and Alois Hornsteiner, 1966 in Mittenwald (Bavaria)

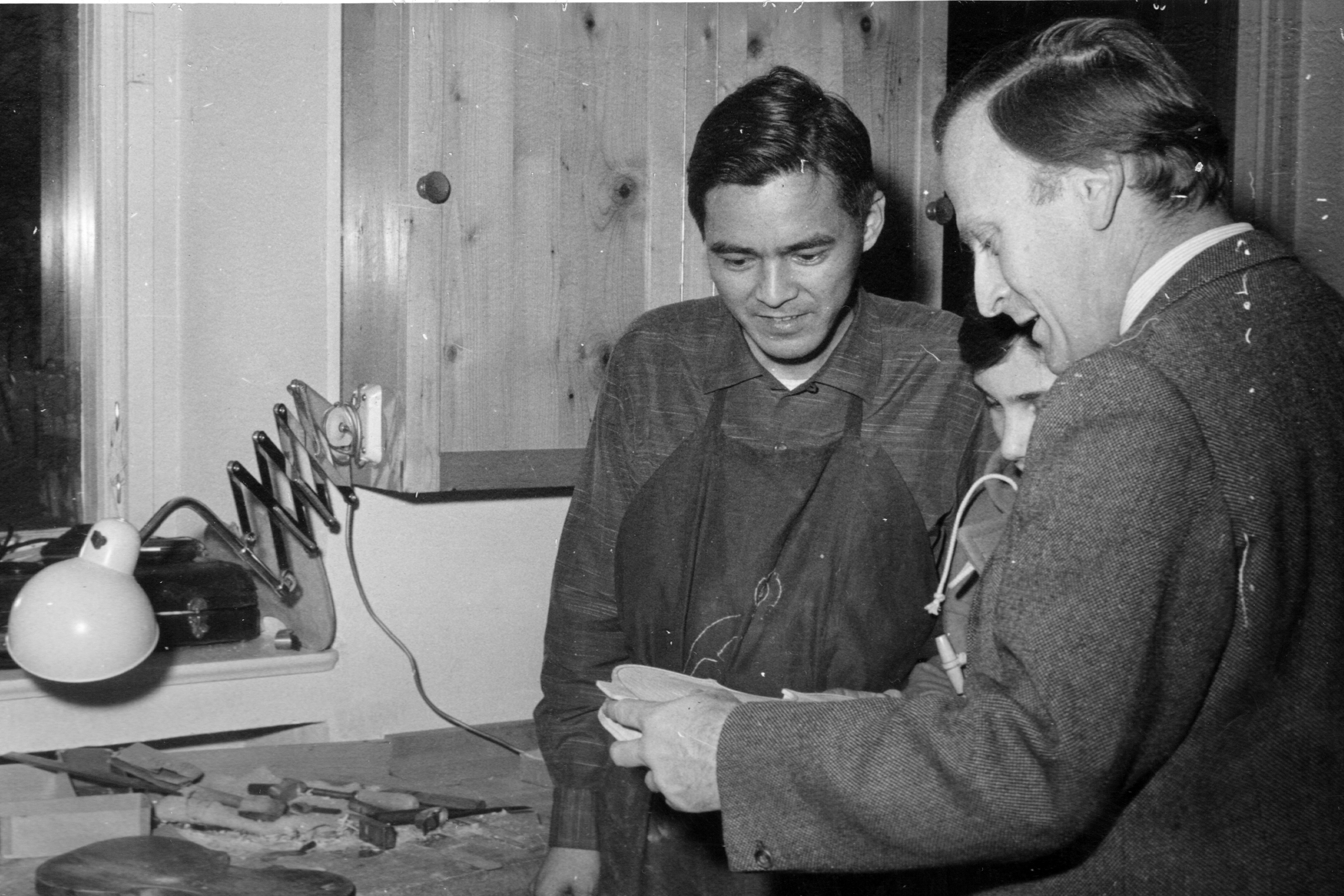
Murata with Yehudi Menuhin in Mittenwald 1963

In 1956, he became a board member of the Japan String Instrument Manufacturers Association.

Murata became a member of the German Violinmakers Association (VdG) in 1968, the first Japanese to do so.

The Japanese-American luthier Hiroshi Iizuka was an apprentice of Murata’s. He began his apprenticeship in 1971.

In 1974, he was commissioned by the Japan Gagaku Society to restore a Kugo harp, which was used at the Society's 13th public concert at the National Theater on December 17 the same year. The harp’s sound had not been heard for 1200 years.

In 1976, he won the gold medal in the Violin Society of America's violin making competition on the occasion of the USA’s Bicentennial of Independence.

On April 2nd 1979, Murata opened the Tokyo Violin Making School in his private home, to train his successors.

In 1986, he was the first person from Asia to become a member of the Entente International des Luthiers et Architiers (EILA, engl. International Society of Violin and Bow Makers Entente Internationale des Maitres Luthiers et Archetiers d'Art (EILA) ).

He was a regular jury member of the Prague International Violin Making Competition (1986-1993), the International Henryk Wieniawski Violin Making Competition (1986-2001), the International Tchaikovsky Competition (1986-2002), the Sofia International String Competition (1987-1996), and a jury member of the Long-Thibaud-Crespin Competition in 1990.

In July 1998, he became an honorary member of the Japan String Instrument Makers’ Association.

In March 2007, at the age of 80, he closed the violin making school in Tokyo.

On January 30, 2020, he died from cancer at the age of 92. The funeral service was held on February 6 the same year.

== Trivia ==
- The inspiration for his pseudonym Soroku Murata (無量塔 蔵六) comes from his great-grandfather, who was a follower of Soroku Murata (Japanese 村田蔵六, real name Masujirō Ōmura; Japanese 大村益次郎).
- Murata had a passion for motorcycles.
- Students of Murata’s violin making school received the status of German journeyman craftsmen upon successful completion of their studies, and could also qualify for the master craftsman's examination (Meisterprüfung) by working under a German master craftsman for the duration of three years.

== Publications ==
=== Books ===
- Baiorin [The Violin]. Nihon Gakki. March 1965.
- Vaiorin [The Violin]. Iwanami Shinsho 921. Iwanani Shoten. February 1975. ISBN 9784004140580.
- Vaiorin wo yomu hon – Motto shiritai Vaiorin no hanashi [Violins. A book for those who want to know more.]. Soroku Murata, Hiroshi Kawabata. To-on. August 1998. ISBN 9784636208757.

=== Articles ===
- "Vaiorin zukuri no Oyagata, Shūgyō Jidai [Apprenticeship years of a master violin maker]". Geijutsu Shinchō. 15 (3). Shinchōsha: 130–132. March 1964.
- "Vaiorin to Mokuzai [The Violin and the Wood]". Mokuzai Kōgyō. 20 (2). Nihon Mokuzai Kakō Gijutsu Kyōkai: 75–79. February 1965.
- "Nihon Mokuzai Kakō Gijutsu Kyōkai". Kagaku Asahi. 26 (10). Asahi Shimbunsha: 83–86. October 1966.
- "Vaiorin no Meiki to sono Shūhen. Vaiorin Seisakusha no Ichigen [Famous violins and their context. A word from a violin maker]". Ongaku No Tomo. 32 (7). Ongaku no Tomosha: 114–116. June 1974.
- "Nihonjin ha Kiyō deha arimasen. Kokiyō nano desu. [Japanese are not craftsman specialists. But they are skillful generalists]". Ginō to Gijutsu. Shokugyō Nōryoku Kaihatsu Gijutsu Zasshi. 1975 (4). Koyō Mondai Kenkyūkai: 1. June 1975.
- "Mai Supiikā wo kataru [Talking about my speakers]". Rajio Gijutsu. 31 (2). Aiē Shuppan, Inpuresu: 179–187. January 1977.
- "Watashi no Shūgyō Jidai. Nishi Doitsu no Totei Seido [My apprenticeship years. The training system in West Germany.]". Bōsei. 8 (2). Tōkai Kyōiku Kenkyūjo: 58–65. February 1977.
- "Shin, Vaiorin Dangi [Updated version: Sermon on the violin]". Kyōiku Ongaku. 21 (9). Ongaku no Tomosha: 26–28. September 1977.
- "Vaiorin Seisakusha ga tsukuru Ōdio no Sekai [The acoustic universe created by a violin maker.]". Rajio Gijutsu. 33 (2). Aiē Shuppan, Inpuresu: 32–33. January 1979.
- "Maisutā Seido no Chōsho to Nihon no Kantokusha [Advantages of the German Master System and Japanese supervisors.]". Sangyō Kunren. 25 (10). Nihon Sangyō Kunren Kyōkai: 2–17. October 1979.
- "Murata Soroku, Chiyonobu Takashi: Taiwa. Ongaku, Ningen, Kyōiku [Murata Soroku, Chiyonobu Takash: Exchange of opinions. Music, Human Beings, Education.]". Kyōiku Ongaku. 35 (7). Ongaku no Tomosha. June 1980.
- "Gakki no hanashi (II) Gengakki [Talks about music (II): stringed instruments]". Nihon Onkyōgaku Gakkaishi. 36 (8). Nihon Onkyōgaku Gakkai: 414–418. August 1980.
- "Chūkohin [Used Goods]". Tashikana Me. Kokumin Seikatsu Sentā no Kurashi to Shōhin Tesuto no Jōhōshi (11). Kokumin Seikatsu Sentā: 49. November 1982.
- "Nipponjin'83 [The Japanese in *83]". Shūkan Gendai. 25 (8). Kōdansha: 80–84. February 1983.
- "Vaiorin [The Violin]". Konsensasu. 1983 (9). Konsensasu Henshūbu: 10–11. September 1983.
- "Murata Soroku, Tanahashi Yūji: Shokuningei ga Geijutsu ni Shōka suru Toki (Kokoro wo kataru) [Murata Soroku, Tanahashi Yūji: When craft sublimates into art (spoken from the heart).]". Tsūsan Jānaru. 17 (7). Tsūshō Sangyō Chōsakai: 78–85. June 1984.
- "Vaiorin ni umorete shinitai [I want to pass away buried in violins.]". Rikurūto Kyaria Gaidansu. 23 (1). Rikurūto: 60–65. January 1991.
- "Vaiorin ni mochiirareru Sozai [Materials used for Violins]". Shinsozai. 3 (11). Nihon Kōgyō Shuppan: 50–53. November 1992.
- "Vaiorin Seisaku Mini Gaishi [An unofficial Mini-History of Violin Making]". Kenchiku Zasshi (1341). Nihon Kenchiku Gakkai: 14. April 1993.
- "Vaiorin wo tsukuru Zaimoku [Wood used for violins]". Bōsei. 25 (1). Tōkai Kyōiku Kenkyūjo: 24–27. January 1994.
- "Kono Hito ni kiku "Ii Oto wo dasu Baiorin ha mitame mo Ereganto desu." [Ask this person. "A violin that sounds good also looks elegant."]". Kyōiku jihō (571). Tōkyōto Shinkyōiku Kenkyūkai: 11–14. August 1995.
- "Gengakki no Rekiji (1) ～Tanjō (?) kara Kuremona ha no Shutsugen made [History of strings (1): from the origin (?) to the appearance of the Cremona school.]". Ongaku Gendai. 34 (8). Geijutsu Gendaisha: 87–89. August 2004.

== Further information ==
- Murata Soroku Vaiorin wo kataru [Soroku Murata. A Talk about Violins]
- Obituary on Soroku Murata
