= Ruggiero Ricci =

American violinist (1918–2012)

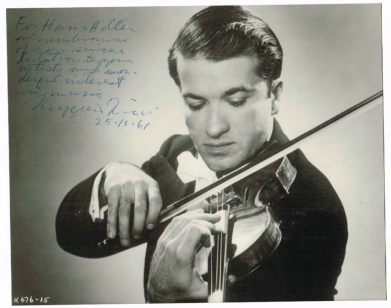
- Ruggiero Ricci, 1961
- Born: 24 July 1918; San Bruno, California, US
- Died: 5 August 2012 (aged 94); Palm Springs, California, US
- Occupations: violinist, pedagogue

External audio
- You may hear Ruggiero Ricci performing Antonin Dvorak's Romance for Violin and Orchestra in F Minor, Op. 11 with Walter Susskind conducting the St. Louis Symphony Orchestra in 1974 Here on archive.org
- You may hear Ruggiero Ricci performing the Preludio from Johann Sebastian Bach's Violin Partita No. 3, in E Major, BWV 1006.1 circa 1966 Here on archive.org

Ruggiero Ricci (24 July 1918 – 5 August 2012) was an American violinist known for performances and recordings of the works of Paganini.

== Biography ==
He was born in San Bruno, California, the son of Italian immigrants who first named him Woodrow Wilson Rich. His brother was cellist George Ricci (1923–2010), originally named George Washington Rich. His sister Emma played violin with the New York Metropolitan Opera. His father first taught him to play the violin. At age seven, Ricci studied with Louis Persinger and Elizabeth Lackey. Persinger would become his piano accompanist for many recitals and recordings.

Ricci gave his first public performance in 1928 at the age of 10 in San Francisco where he played works by Wieniawski and Vieuxtemps. He gained a reputation for being a child prodigy. At the age of 11, he gave his first orchestral performance, playing the Mendelssohn concerto, and soon after he had his highly successful debut at Carnegie Hall.

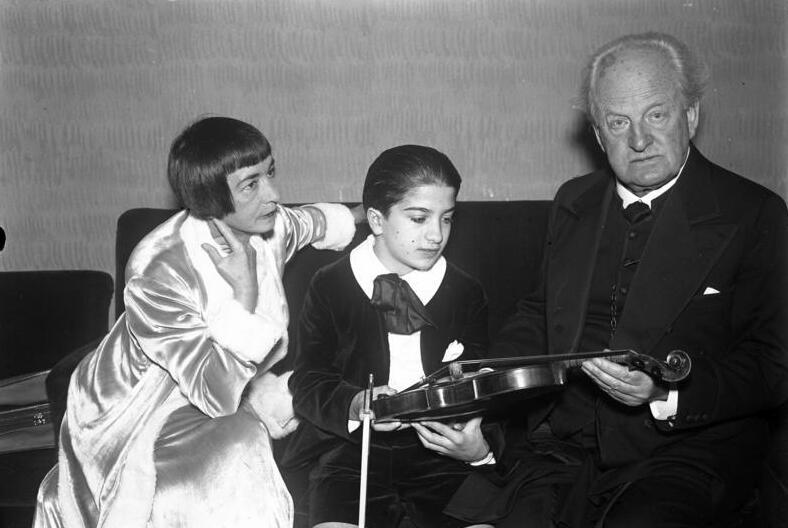
Ricci (middle) with Gerhart Hauptmann in 1932

In the 1930s Ricci studied in Berlin with Georg Kulenkampff, where he learned a "German style" of playing in the tradition of Adolf Busch. He also studied with Mishel Piastro and Paul Stassevich.

He served in the US Army from 1942 until 1945, where he was an "entertainment specialist".

In 1947, Ricci was the first violinist to record the complete 24 Caprices, Op. 1, by Paganini, in their original form. (Note: The first recording of any version was that of the arrangement by Ferdinand David for violin and piano, made in 1940 by the Austrian-born Ossy Renardy.) Ricci's first recording was on the Decca recording label. After his time in the military, he uncovered many pieces by 19th-century composers that he would perform solo. In 1993, he recorded the Complete Works for Violin and Orchestra by Saint-Saens. He also performed the world premieres of pieces by many contemporary composers, including the violin concertos by Gottfried von Einem, Carlos Veerhoff and Alberto Ginastera.

Aside from performing over 6,000 concerts in 65 countries during his 70-year solo career, Ricci also made over 500 recordings, on every major label. He taught violin at Indiana University, University of North Carolina School of the Arts, the Juilliard School and the University of Michigan. He also taught at the University Mozarteum in Salzburg, Austria. Ricci held master classes in the United States and Europe. He wrote Left Hand Technique, a pedagogical volume for violin published by G. Schirmer. The Persian volume of this book is also published by Mohsen Kazemian, Iran.

Ricci owned many precious instruments, including the Guarneri Del Gesù violin known as the ex-Bronisław Huberman of 1734, a Storioni, a Luiz Bellini, a Curtin & Alf, a David Bague and a couple of Regazzi. He played, on 18 September 1997, his fourth recording of the Paganini Caprices on Paganini's own Guarneri, Il Cannone, on loan to him by the City of Genoa, Italy.

Ricci died of heart failure in August 2012 at his home in Palm Springs, California, aged 94.

== Selected performances ==
With the aim of showcasing great masterpieces of violin concerto repertoire, Ricci, accompanied by members of the American Symphony Orchestra, performed 15 concertos over a series of four concerts at Lincoln Center's Philharmonic Hall, all in a span of 30 days, under a different conductor each time.

- 17 November 1964, Gerhard Samuel (1925–2008), conductor
  - Bach – Violin Concerto in E major
  - Mendelssohn – Violin Concerto
  - Hindemith – Kammermusik No. 4
  - Prokofieff – Violin Concerto No. 2
- 1 December 1964, Ezra Rachlin, conductor
  - Mozart – Violin Concerto No. 5
  - Bartók – Violin Concerto No. 2
  - Tchaikovsky – Violin Concerto
- 8 December 1964, Jacques Singer, conductor
  - Paganini – Violin Concerto No. 1
  - Stravinsky – Violin Concerto
  - Brahms – Violin Concerto
- 16 December 1964, Igor Buketoff, conductor
  - Vivaldi – Four Seasons (counts as 4 concertos)
  - Beethoven – Violin Concerto

Ricci reunited with Singer in Portland with the Oregon Symphony, and performed the Paganini, Stravinsky, and Brahms Concertos.

== Paganini Caprices recordings ==
External audio
- You may hear Ruggiero Ricci performing Paganini's 24 Caprices for Solo Violin in 1947 Here on archive.org

Ricci made the first complete recording of the 24 Caprices in their original version in 1947 in London. Ricci later made further recordings of the complete set, as stated below:

- 1947 | 2LPs | Decca LK.4025, Nos. 1–12; LXT.2588, Nos. 13–24 mono; 1950 reprint | 2LPs | London Decca LL.264, Nos. 1–12; LL.252, Nos. 13–24, mono (London, July 1947)
- 1959 | LP | Decca LXT.5569 mono / SXL.2194 stereo (Victoria Hall, Geneva, 1–9 April 1959)
- 1973 | LP | Vox Turnabout TV-S 34528 | plus premiere recording of Caprice d'adieu in E major, MS 68 (USA, 1973)
- 1978 | 2LP | Price-Less C–93042 (CD reprint: Price-Less D12179) | "Golden Jubilee" – recorded direct-to-disc at Soundstage Recording Studio, Toronto, Canada | plus Caprice d'adieu in E major, MS 68 plus Duo merveille in C major, MS 6 (Toronto, 1978)
- 1988 | CD | Radio Vaticana 061–003 / Biddulph LAW 016 | performed on Paganini's Guarneri del Gesù "Il Cannone" (Genova, 16–20 April 1988)
- 1998 | CD | Dynamic CDS244 | 80th Birthday Concert, live in Szeged Synagogue, Hungary | version for violin and orchestra by Laszlo Meszlény (Nos. 1–23) and Chris Nicholls (No. 24), based on the piano accompaniment composed by Robert Schumann (Hungary, 17 May 1998)
- 1982 | LaserDisc-NTSC | One Eleven, Ltd. URS-V-91610 | 69 mins. | BBC Scotland, Live television performance (p)1991
- 1987 | VHS-NTSC | Shar Products Company RR–1 (Michigan University, 10 January 1987) | unedited performance
