= Hiroshi Izuka =

Japanese-American luthier (born 1945)

Hiroshi Iizuka
- Born: July 21, 1945 (age 80); Maebashi, Japan
- Occupation: Luthier
- Years active: 1977–present
- Known for: Viola design innovations

Hiroshi Iizuka is a Japanese master craftsman of violins and violas who heads a workshop in Philadelphia.

== Early life ==
He was born in Maebashi, Japan, in 1945. After graduating from college in 1968, he worked various jobs in Tokyo before pursuing instrument making.

In 1971, he began an apprenticeship with Soroku Murata, founder of the Tokyo Violin Making School. From 1973 to 1977, he trained in Mittenwald, Germany, under Josef Kantuscher and received a journeyman’s diploma from the German Chamber of Handwork in 1974.

In 1976, Iizuka received a gold medal and Certificate of Merit at the Violin Society of America competition in Philadelphia. He received additional certificates at later VSA competitions, including in 1982.

== Career ==
Iizuka established his workshop in Pennsylvania in 1977, and his work gained broader recognition after violist Emanuel Vardi purchased one of his instruments in 1982.

According to Strings Magazine, Iizuka builds approximately 10 to 12 instruments per year, primarily violas. He has made more than 380 instruments since beginning his independent practice.

Musicians known to have played Iizuka instruments include Michael Tree of the Guarneri Quartet and Ori Kam of the Jerusalem Quartet.

His instruments have been referenced in discussions about modern versus historical Italian instruments. Violinist Giora Schmidt, who plays an Iizuka violin, participated in a widely reported double-blind study comparing modern and antique violins.

== Instrument design ==
Iizuka's viola designs incorporate structural modifications intended to balance tonal depth and playability.

=== Viola d’amore-inspired model ===
Beginning in 1979, Iizuka developed a model incorporating design features inspired by the historical viola d'amore while adapting the instrument for modern viola setup and technique.

=== Rubenesque model ===
Introduced in 1992, the Rubenesque model incorporates shortened corners and a modified lower bout to reduce perceived playing length while maintaining body resonance.

== Personal life ==
Iizuka moved to the United States in 1977 with his wife, Daniela Stern.
