= William Cohen =

American politician (born 1940)

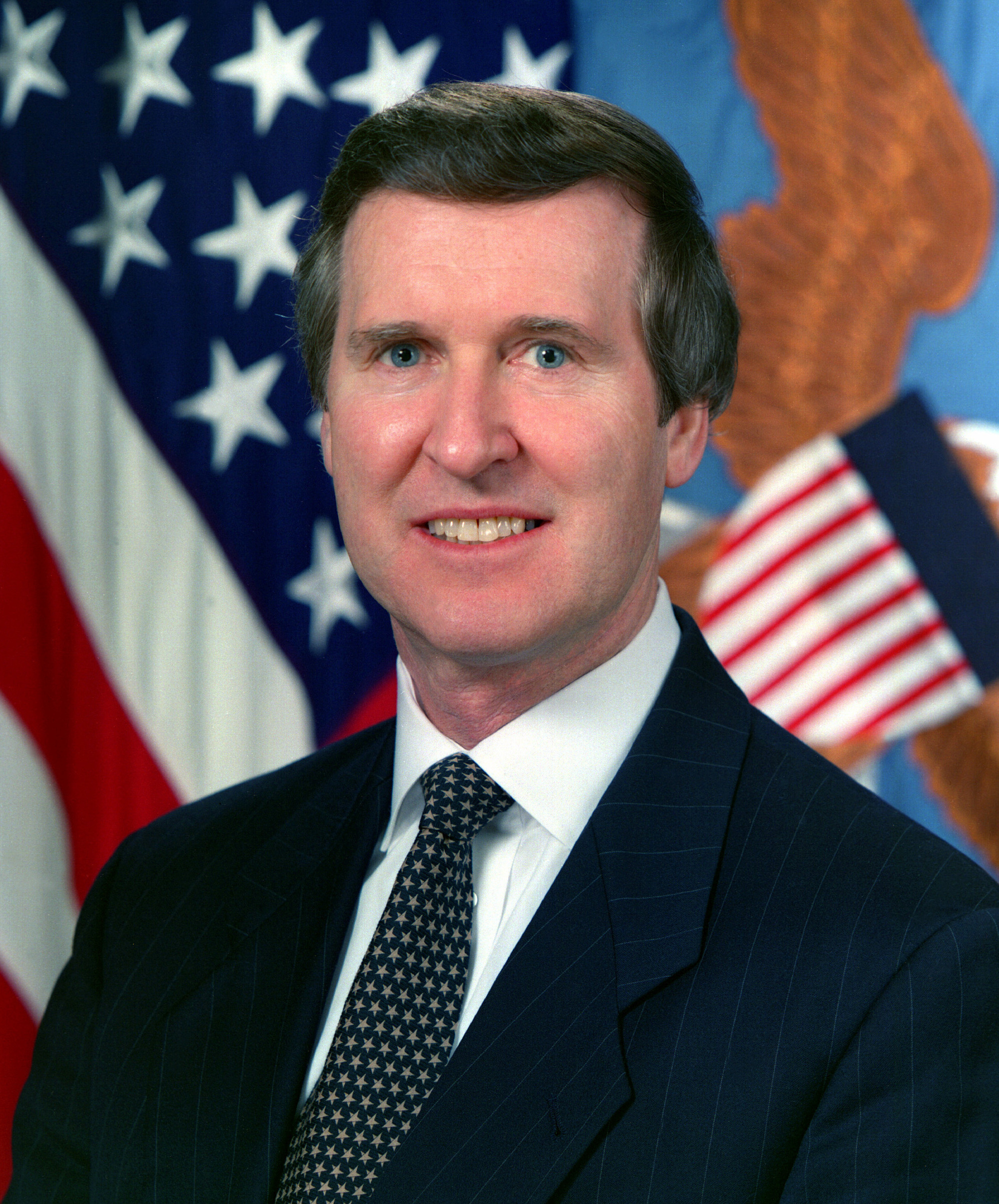
- Official portrait, 1997

20th United States Secretary of Defense
- In office January 24, 1997 – January 20, 2001
- President: Bill Clinton
- Deputy: John Hamre; Rudy de Leon
- Preceded by: William J. Perry
- Succeeded by: Donald Rumsfeld

Chair of the Senate Aging Committee
- In office January 4, 1995 – January 3, 1997
- Preceded by: David Pryor
- Succeeded by: Chuck Grassley

Chair of the Senate Indian Affairs Committee
- In office January 5, 1981 – January 3, 1983
- Preceded by: John Melcher
- Succeeded by: Mark Andrews

United States Senator from Maine
- In office January 3, 1979 – January 3, 1997
- Preceded by: William Hathaway
- Succeeded by: Susan Collins

Member of the U.S. House of Representatives from Maine's 2nd district
- In office January 3, 1973 – January 3, 1979
- Preceded by: William Hathaway
- Succeeded by: Olympia Snowe

Personal details
- Born: William Sebastian Cohen; August 28, 1940 (age 86) Bangor, Maine, U.S.
- Party: Republican
- Spouses: Diana Dunn (div. 1987) Janet Langhart (m. 1996)
- Children: 2
- Education: Bowdoin College (BA); Boston University (LLB)
- Cohen's voice Cohen during a Senate Armed Services Committee hearing on the Kosovo War and the NATO bombing of Yugoslavia. Recorded October 14, 1999

William Sebastian Cohen (born August 28, 1940) is an American attorney, author, and politician. A member of the Republican Party, Cohen also served as a member of the United States House of Representatives from 1973 to 1979, United States Senate from 1979 to 1997, and as secretary of defense from 1997 to 2001 under President Bill Clinton.

Described as "a Republican moderate from Maine" and "something of a maverick centrist" by David Halberstam, Cohen had very good working relations with President Clinton and National Security Adviser Sandy Berger and an "almost ideal" collaboration with the Joint Chiefs of Staff; however, he often clashed with Secretary of State Madeleine Albright, whom he saw as "a grandstander, too outspoken on policy matters, and too eager to use military force."

== Early life and education ==
Cohen was born in Bangor, Maine. His mother, Clara (née Hartley), was of Protestant Irish ancestry. His father, Reuben Cohen, was born in New York and was the son of a Russian Jewish immigrant. His parents owned the Bangor Rye Bread Co.

Pursuant to his father's wishes, Cohen was raised Jewish, attended a synagogue, and also attended Hebrew School in preparation for his bar mitzvah, but he decided not to follow through with his bar mitzvah when he was informed that he would have to convert formally to Judaism. He then began to practice Christianity, and he identifies as a Unitarian Universalist.

After his 1958 graduation from Bangor High School, Cohen attended Bowdoin College. In 1962, he was awarded a bachelor of arts degree cum laude in Latin. While a student at Bowdoin, Cohen was initiated as a brother of the Kappa chapter of the Psi Upsilon fraternity. Cohen attended law school at the Boston University School of Law, and received a bachelor of laws degree cum laude in 1965.

While in high school and college, Cohen was a basketball player and was named to the Maine all-state high school and college basketball team, and at Bowdoin he was inducted into the New England All-Star Hall of Fame.

== Legal, academic, and early political career ==
He became an assistant county attorney for Penobscot County (1968–1970). In 1968, he became an instructor at Husson College in Bangor. Later, he was an instructor in business administration at the University of Maine (1968–1972).

Cohen served as the vice president of the Maine Trial Lawyers Association (1970–1972) and as a member of the Bangor School Board (1971–1972). He became a fellow at Harvard Kennedy School in 1972. In 1975, he was named as one of "ten outstanding young men" by the United States Junior Chamber

Cohen was elected to the Bangor City Council (1969–1972) and served as Bangor Mayor in 1971–1972.

== House of Representatives and Senate ==
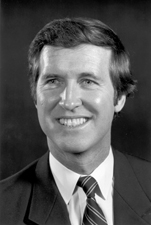
Senator William Cohen early in his political career

In the 1972 election, Cohen won a seat in the U.S. House of Representatives, representing Maine's 2nd congressional district, succeeding Democrat William Hathaway, who was elected to the U.S. Senate. Cohen defeated Democratic State Senator Elmer H. Violette of Van Buren.

During his first term in Congress, Cohen was assigned to the House Judiciary Committee, where he participated in the 1974 impeachment hearings against President Richard Nixon. He was one of the first Republicans on the committee to support impeaching Nixon. During this time, Time magazine named him one of "America's 200 Future Leaders". In July 1974, he said,

I have been faced with the terrible responsibility of assessing the conduct of a President that I voted for, believed to be the best man to lead this country. But a President who in the process by act or acquiescence allowed the rule of law and the Constitution to slip under the boots of indifference and arrogance and abuse.

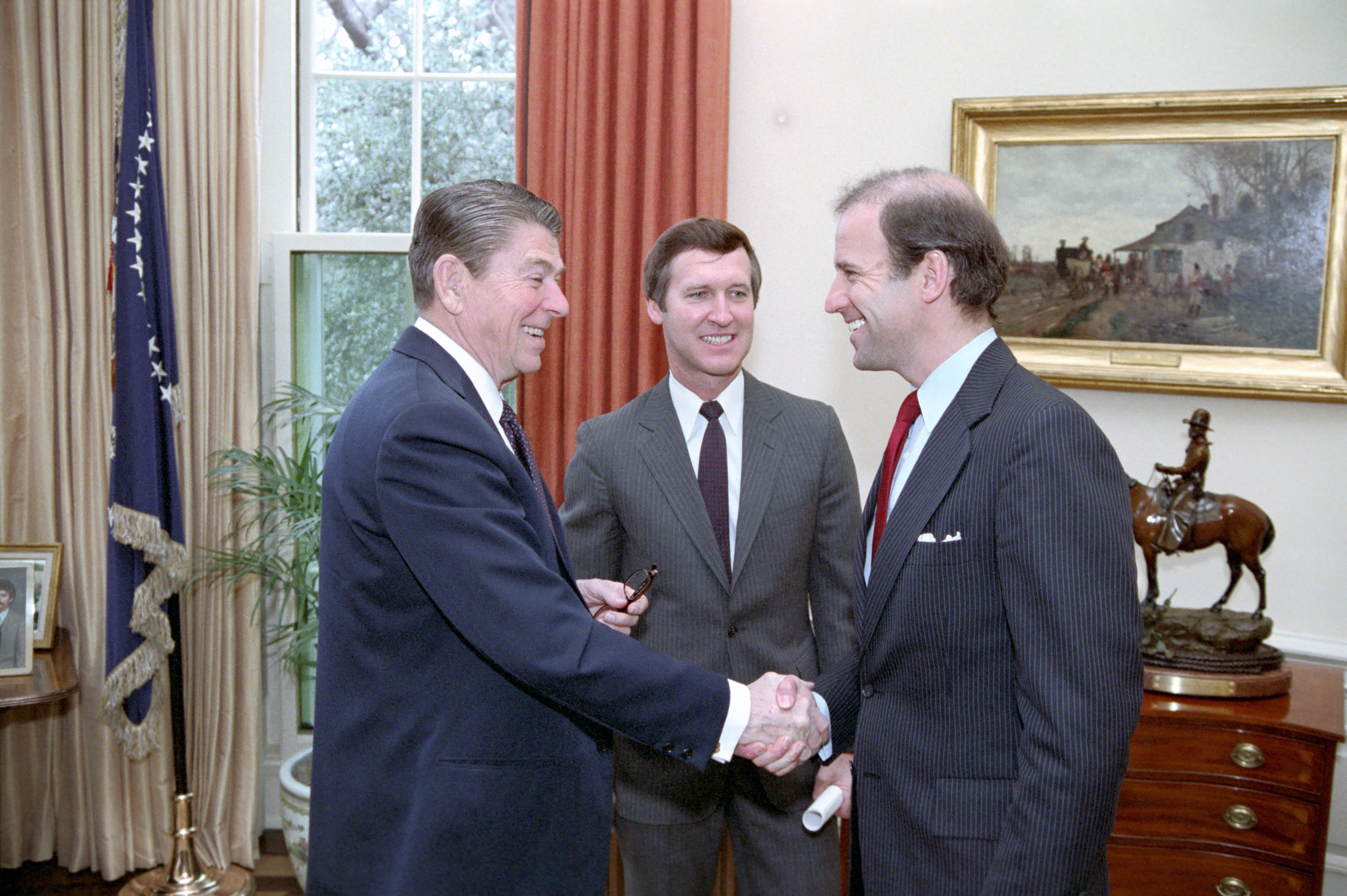
Cohen with President Ronald Reagan and then-Senator Joe Biden in 1984

After three terms in the House, Cohen was elected to the U.S. Senate in 1978, defeating incumbent William Hathaway in his first bid for reelection. Cohen was reelected in 1984 and 1990, serving a total of 18 years in the Senate (1979–1997). In 1990, he defeated Democrat Neil Rolde. Cohen developed a reputation as a moderate Republican with liberal views on social issues and has been described as "a career-long maverick with a reputation for fashioning compromise out of discord."

In 1994 Cohen investigated the federal government's process for acquiring information technology, and his report, Computer Chaos: Billions Wasted Buying Federal Computer Systems, generated much discussion. He chose not to run for another Senate term in 1996; Susan Collins, who had worked for Cohen, was elected to succeed him.

While in the Senate, Cohen served on both the Senate Armed Services Committee and the Governmental Affairs Committee (1979–1997) and was a member of the Senate Intelligence Committee 1983–1991 and again 1995–1997, serving as Vice Chairman from 1987 to 1991. He also participated in the drafting of several notable laws related to defense matters, including the Competition in Contracting Act (1984), the Montgomery G.I. Bill Act (1984), the Goldwater–Nichols Act (1986), the Intelligence Oversight Reform Act (1991), the Federal Acquisition Reform Act (1996), the Nunn–Cohen Act Amendment creating the United States Special Operations Command, and the Information Technology Management Reform Act, also known as the Clinger–Cohen Act (1996). Cohen voted in favor of the bill establishing Martin Luther King Jr. Day as a federal holiday and the Civil Rights Restoration Act of 1987 (as well as to override President Reagan's veto). Cohen voted in favor of the nominations of Robert Bork and Clarence Thomas to the U.S. Supreme Court.

== Secretary of Defense ==
On December 5, 1996, President Bill Clinton announced his selection of Cohen as Secretary of Defense, saying that he was the "right person" to build on the achievements of retiring secretary William Perry "to secure the bipartisan support America's armed forces must have and clearly deserve." As Secretary of Defense Cohen played a large role in directing the United States military actions in Iraq and Kosovo, including the dismissal of Wesley Clark from his post as the NATO Supreme Allied Commander. Both Operation Desert Fox in Iraq and Operation Allied Force in Kosovo were launched just months after al-Qaeda carried out the United States embassy bombings in Dar es Salaam, Tanzania and Nairobi, Kenya in 1998.

=== Confirmation ===
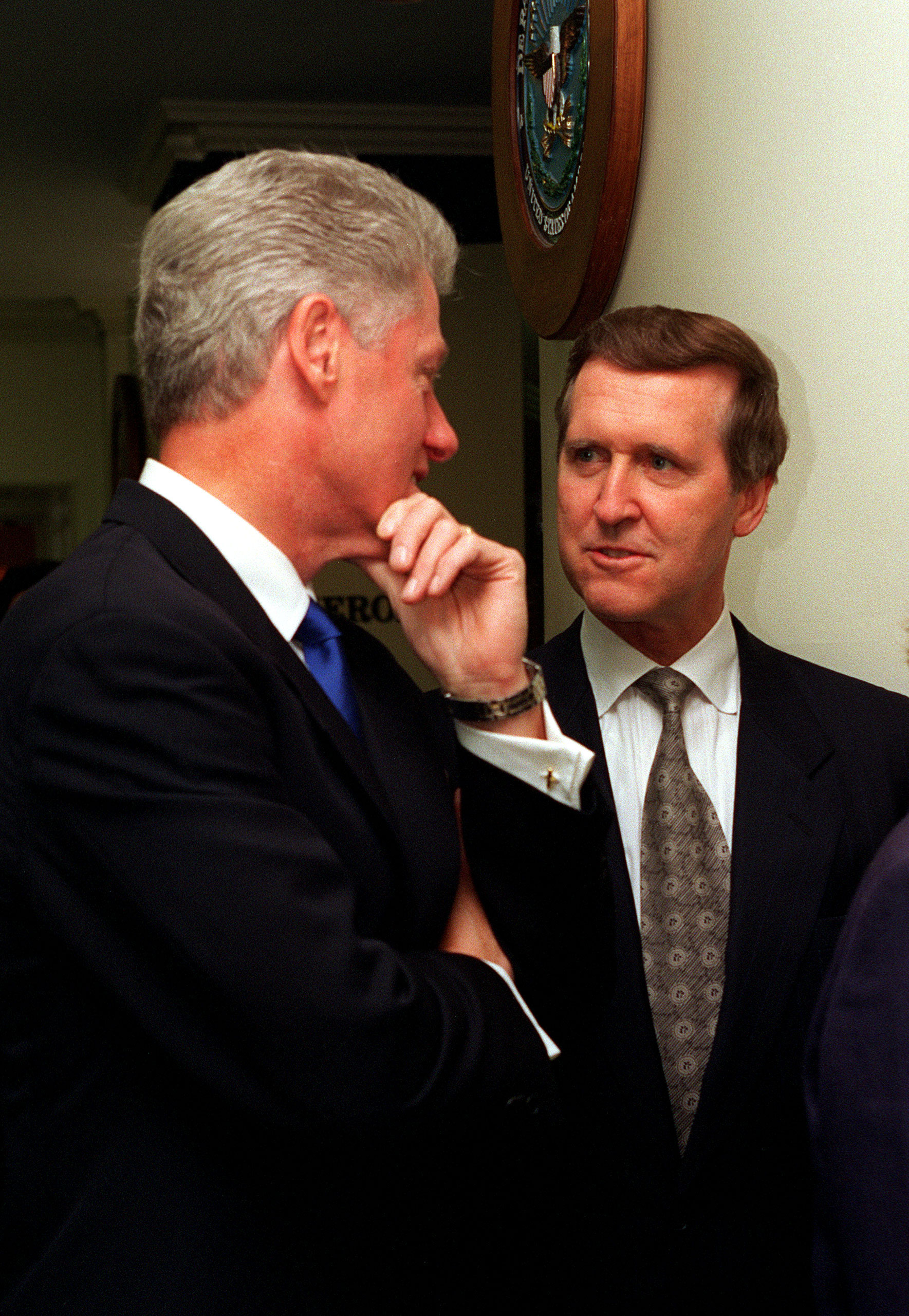
Cohen and President Bill Clinton at The Pentagon, September 1997

During his confirmation hearings, Cohen said he thought he might differ with Clinton on specific national security issues on occasion. He implicitly criticized the Clinton administration for lacking a clear strategy for leaving Bosnia and stated that he thought U.S. troops should definitely be out by mid-1998. He also asserted that he would resist further budget cuts, retain the two regional conflicts strategy, and support spending increases for advanced weapons, even if it necessitated further cuts in military personnel. Cohen questioned whether savings from base closings and acquisition reform could provide enough money for procurement of new weapons and equipment that the Joint Chiefs of Staff thought necessary in the next few years. He supported the expansion of NATO and looked on the proliferation of weapons of mass destruction as the most serious problem the United States faced.

After confirmation by a unanimous Senate vote, Cohen was sworn in as the 20th Secretary of Defense on January 24, 1997. He then settled into a schedule much fuller than he had followed in the Senate. Routinely he arrived at the Pentagon before 7 a.m., received an intelligence briefing, and then met with the Deputy Secretary of Defense (John Hamre 1997–2000, Rudy de Leon 2000–2001) and the chairman of the Joint Chiefs of Staff (Gen. Hugh Shelton). The rest of the day he devoted to policy and budget briefings, visits with foreign and other dignitaries, and to what he termed "ABC" meetings at the White House with Secretary of State Madeleine Albright and National Security Advisor Sandy Berger as well as President Bill Clinton. He also traveled abroad several times during his first months in office.

=== Defense budget ===
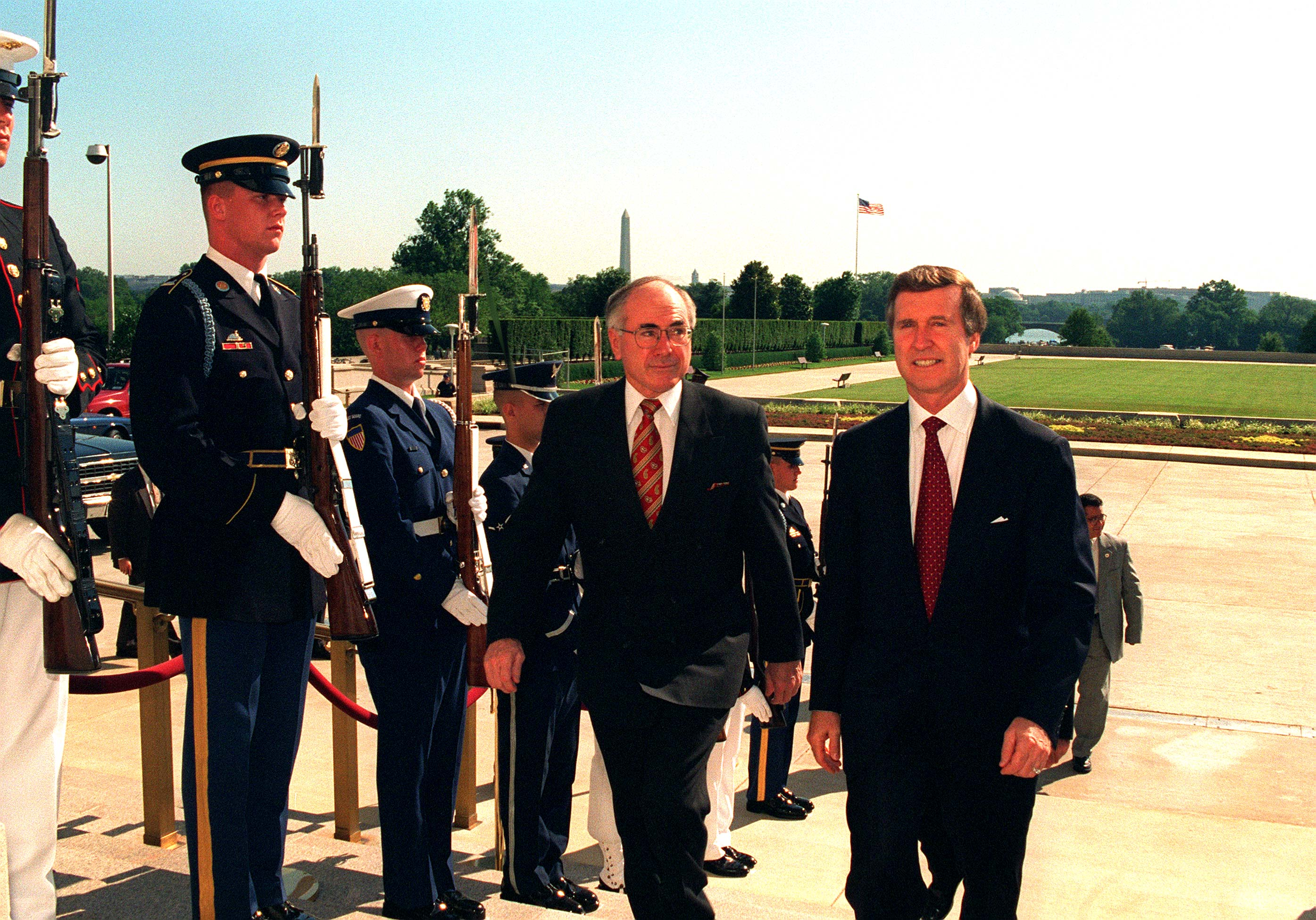
Cohen and Australian prime minister John Howard at The Pentagon, June 27, 1997

One of Cohen's first major duties was to present to Congress the fiscal year 1998 defense budget, which had been prepared under Secretary Perry. Cohen requested a $250.7 billion budget, which represented 3 percent of the nation's estimated gross domestic product for FY 1998. Cohen stressed three top budget priorities: people (recruiting and retaining skilled people through regular military pay raises, new construction or modernization of barracks, and programs for child care, family support, morale, welfare, and recreation), readiness (support for force readiness, training, exercises, maintenance, supplies, and other essential needs), and modernization (development and upgrading of weapon and supporting systems to guarantee the combat superiority of U.S. forces). This meant increasing the funds available for procurement of new systems, with the target set at $60 billion by FY2001.

When he presented the FY1998 budget, Cohen noted that he would involve himself with the Quadrennial Defense Review (QDR), which would focus on the challenges to U.S. security and the nation's military needs over the next decade or more. When the QDR became public in May 1997, it did not fundamentally alter the military's budget, structure, and doctrine. Many defense experts thought it gave insufficient attention to new forms of warfare, such as terrorist attacks, electronic sabotage, and the use of chemical and biological agents. Cohen stated that the Pentagon would retain the "two regional wars" scenario adopted after the end of the Cold War. He decided to scale back purchases of jet fighters, including the Air Force's F-22 Raptor and the Navy's F/A-18E/F Super Hornet, as well as Navy surface ships. The review included cutting another 61,700 active duty service members—15,000 in the Army, 26,900 in the Air Force, 18,000 in the Navy, and 1,800 in the Marine Corps, as well as 54,000 reserve forces, mainly in the Army National Guard, and some 80,000 civilians department-wide. Cohen also recommended two more rounds of base closings in 1999 and 2001. The Pentagon hoped to save $15 billion annually over the next few years to make possible the purchase of new equipment and weapon systems without a substantial budget increase above the current level of $250 billion.

=== International relations and situations ===
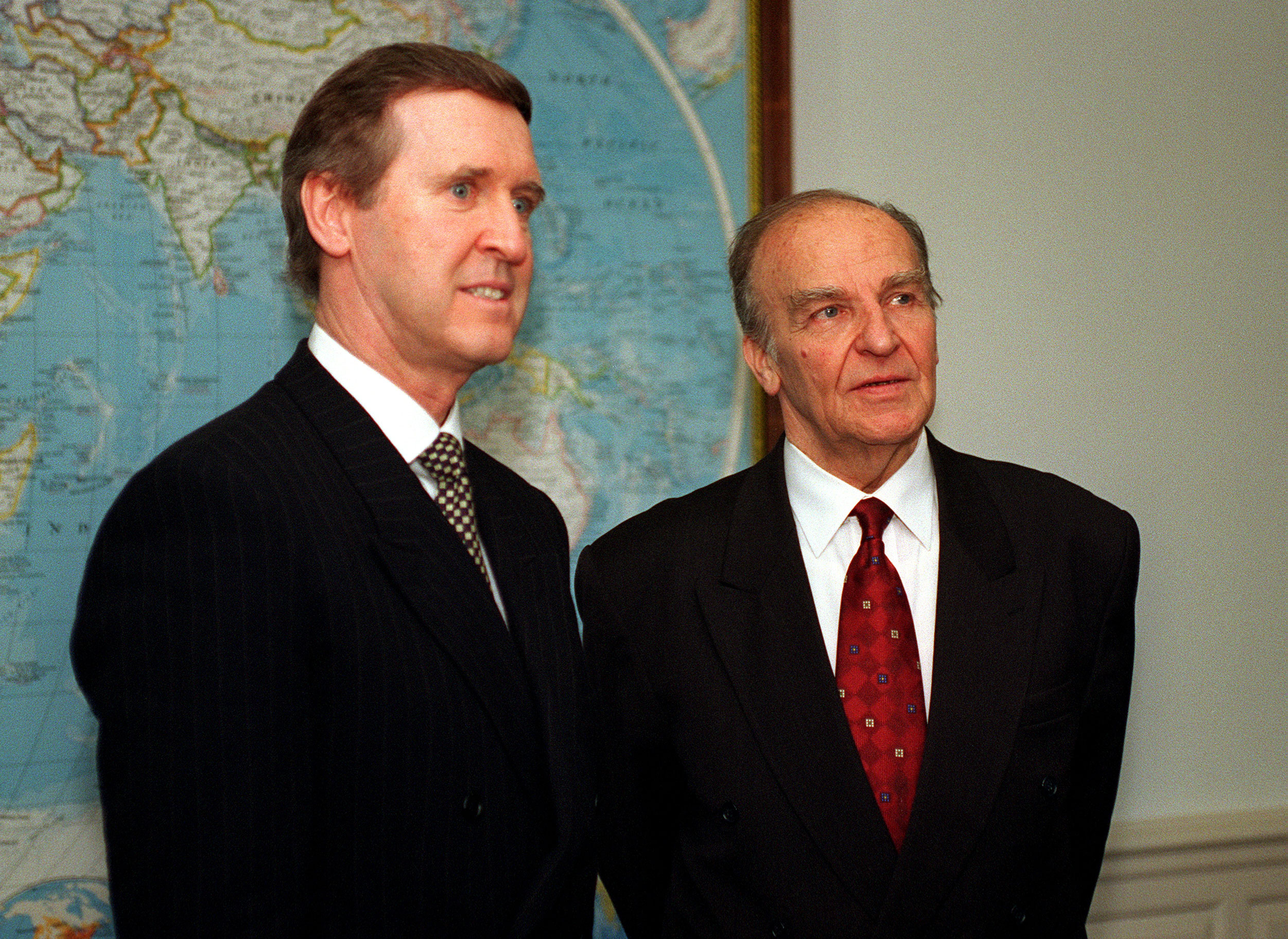
Cohen with Chairman of the Presidency of Bosnia and Herzegovina Alija Izetbegović, March 24, 1997

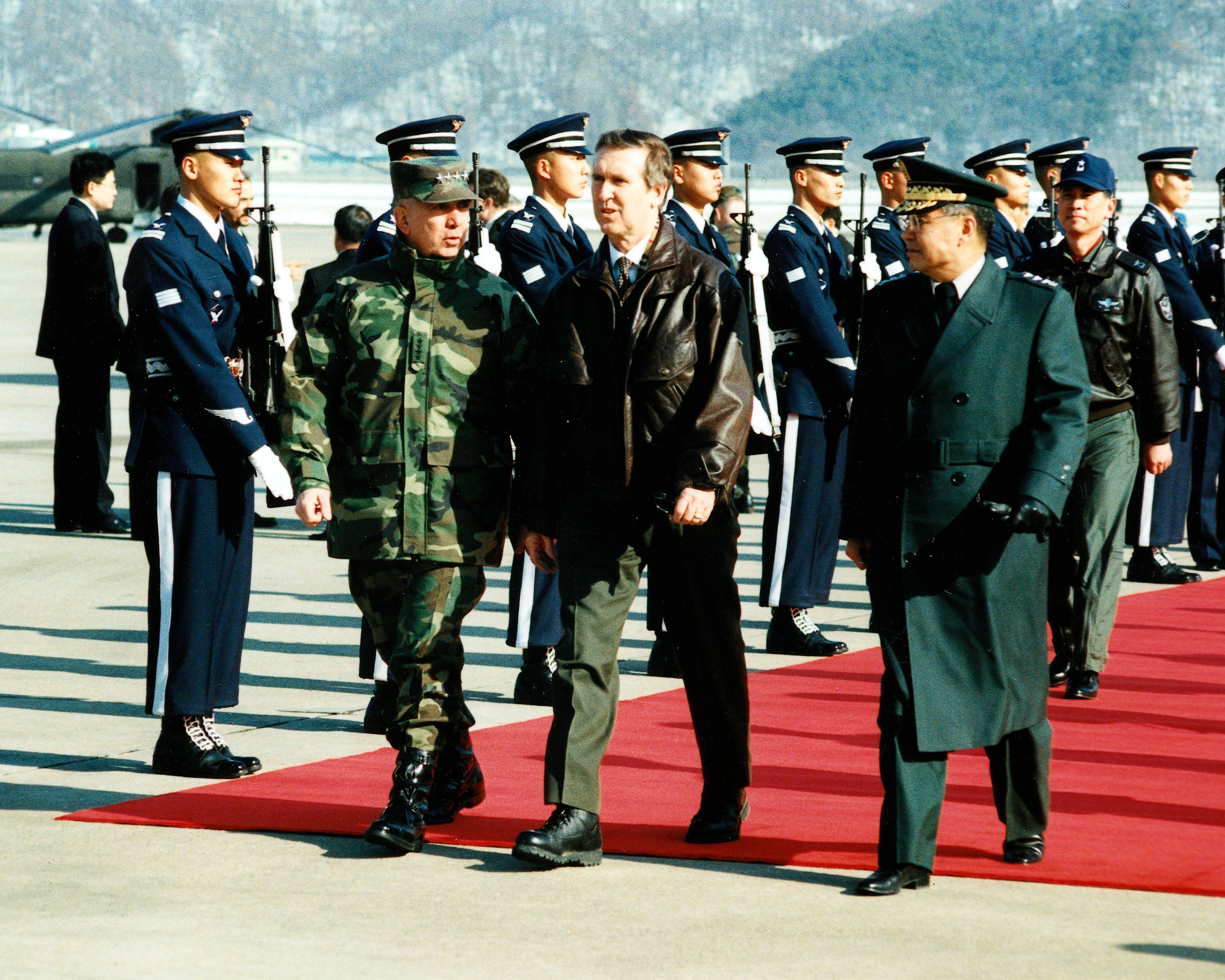
Cohen and General John H. Tilelli Jr., Commander in Chief, United Nations Command/Combined Forces Command/U.S. Forces

Cohen faced the question of the expansion of the North Atlantic Treaty Organization, which he supported and its relationship to Russia. At a summit meeting between President Clinton and Russian president Boris Yeltsin in Helsinki, Finland, in March 1997, Yeltsin acknowledged the inevitability of broader NATO membership. Two months later he agreed, after negotiations with NATO officials, to sign an accord providing for a new permanent council. The council would include Russia, the NATO secretary general, and a representative of the other NATO nations, to function as a forum in which Russia could air a wide range of security issues which it was concerned about. Formal signing of this agreement would pave the way for a July 1997 invitation from NATO to several nations, probably including Poland, Hungary, and the Czech Republic to join the organization.

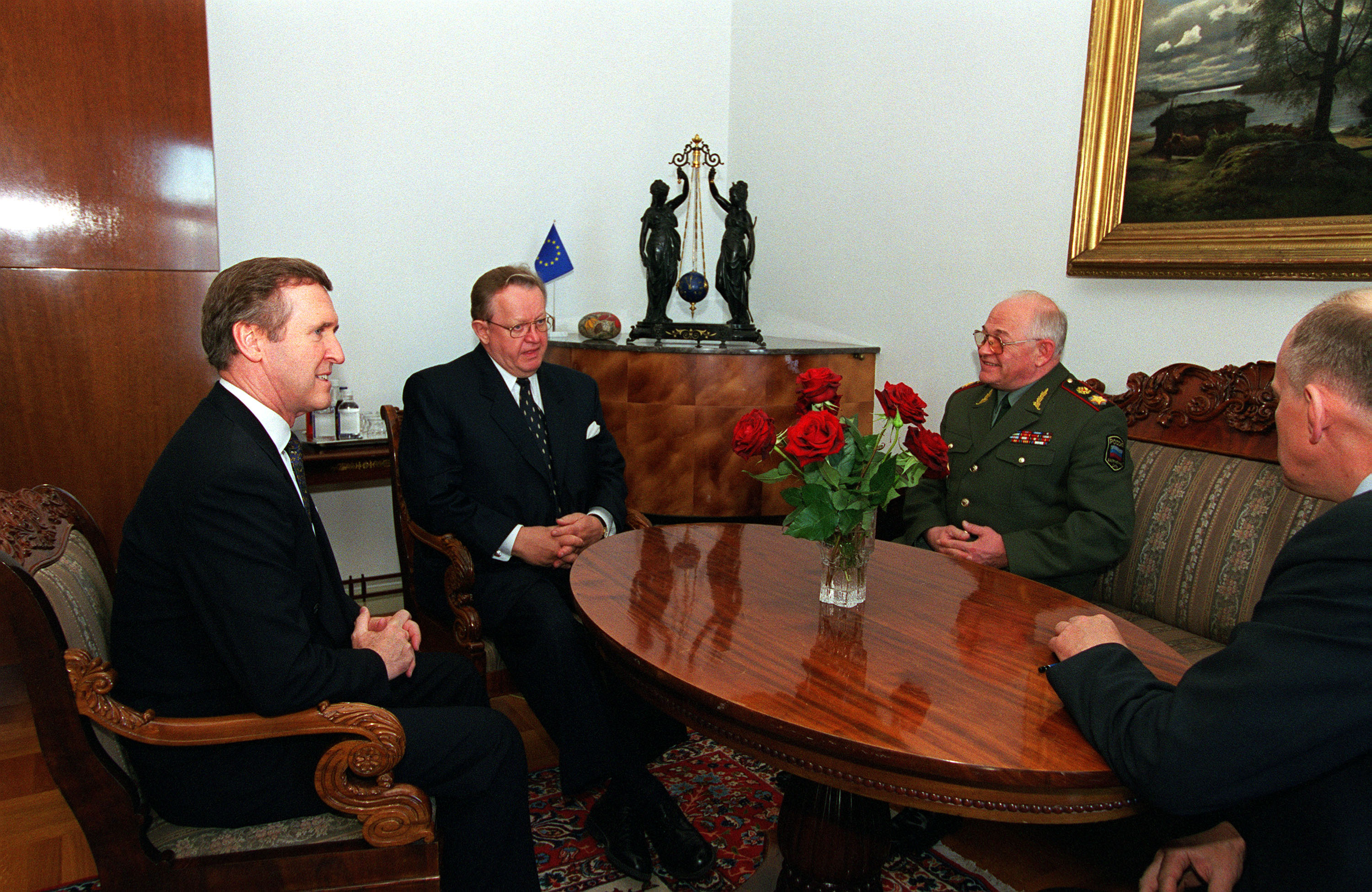
Cohen (left) mediating the Kosovo crisis with President of Finland Martti Ahtisaari (2nd from left) and Russian defense ministers at the Presidential Palace in Helsinki, Finland, in 1999

The proposed U.S. missile defense system received attention at the Helsinki summit, where Clinton and Yeltsin agreed to an interpretation of the 1972 Anti-Ballistic Missile Treaty allowing the United States to proceed with a limited missile defense system currently under development. Specifically, Clinton and Yeltsin agreed to distinguish between a national missile defense system, aimed against strategic weapons, not allowed by the ABMT, and a theater missile defense system to guard against shorter range missile attacks. Some critics thought that any agreement of this kind would place undesirable limits on the development of both theater and strategic missile defenses. The Helsinki meeting also saw progress in arms control negotiations between the United States and Russia, a matter high on Cohen's agenda. Yeltsin and Clinton agreed on the need for early Russian ratification of the Second Strategic Arms Reduction Treaty (START II) and negotiation of START III to make further significant cuts in the strategic nuclear arsenals of both nations.

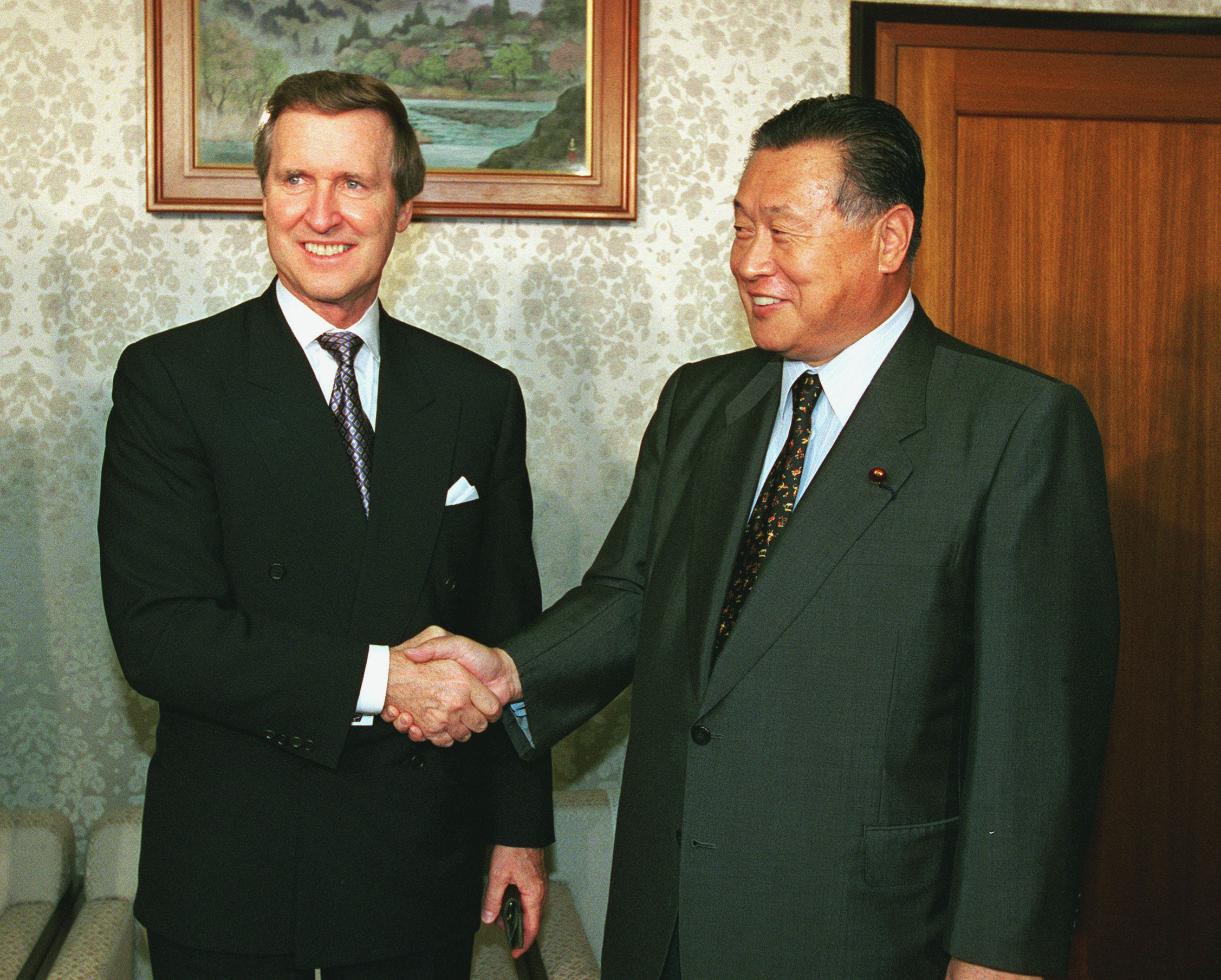
Cohen (left) and Japanese prime minister Yoshiro Mori pose for photographers prior to their meeting at the Kantei building in Tokyo, on September 22, 2000.

At least until mid-1998, the continuation of the existing peacekeeping mission involving U.S. forces in Bosnia and the possibility that other such missions would arise worried Cohen, who earlier had expressed reservations about such operations. Humanitarian efforts that did not involve peacekeeping, such as in Rwanda in the recent past, also seemed likely. Other persistent national security problems, including tension with Iraq in the Persian Gulf area, Libya in North Africa, and North Korea in East Asia, could flare up again, as could the Arab–Israeli conflict.

In preparing future budgets, the challenge would be to find the right mix between money for operation and maintenance accounts on the one hand and modernization procurement funds on the other, while facing the prospect of a flat DoD budget of about $250 billion annually for the next decade or so. A relatively new problem that could affect the DoD budget was vertical integration in the defense industry. It occurred on a large scale in the 1990s as mergers of major defense contractors created a few huge dominant companies, particularly in the aerospace industry. They were called vertical because they incorporated most of the elements of the production process, including parts and subcomponents. Cohen and other Pentagon leaders began to worry that vertical integration could reduce competition and in the long run increase the costs of what the Department of Defense had to buy.

=== Social issues ===
In December 1999, Cohen ordered an immediate review of the Clinton administration's controversial "don't ask, don't tell" policy regarding the status and treatment of gays and lesbians in the U.S. military. The order was given shortly after the president said publicly that the policy was not working. During his tenure as Defense Secretary, Cohen also had to address various other social issues, including: the role of women in combat as well as in other military jobs, racism, and sexual harassment.

== Recent years ==
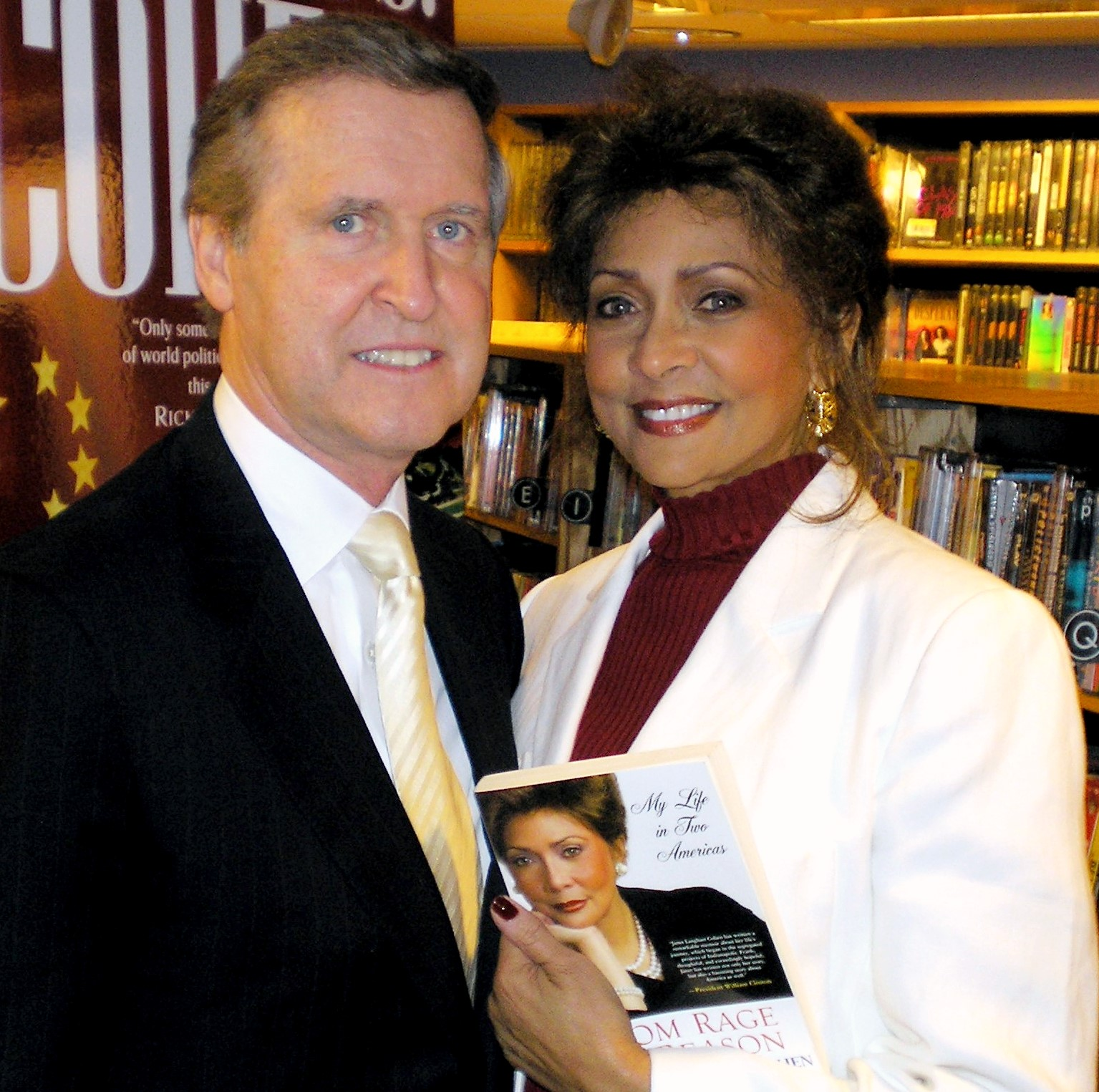
Cohen and his wife, author Janet Langhart, August 2006

After leaving the Pentagon in 2001, Cohen founded The Cohen Group, a business consulting firm, with three Pentagon officials, Bob Tyrer, Jim Bodner, and H.K. Park. Cohen was presented with the Woodrow Wilson Award for Public Service by the Woodrow Wilson Center of the Smithsonian Institution on March 7, 2002, in New York City.

On January 5, 2006, he participated in a meeting at the White House of former Secretaries of Defense and State to discuss United States foreign policy with Bush administration officials.

Cohen has written several books, including mysteries, poetry, and (with George Mitchell) an analysis of the Iran–Contra affair. He is a chairman emeritus of the US–Taiwan Business Council. The Washington Post ran an article entitled "From Public Life to Private Business" about Cohen's abrupt transition to the business of Washington lobbying within "weeks of leaving office." (May 28, 2006). It discussed the affairs of the Cohen Group in greater detail and, while alleging no specific impropriety, took a generally negative view of the former senator and secretary of defense.

On August 21, 2006, Cohen's novel, Dragon Fire, was released. The plot revolves around a secretary of defense who contends with a potential nuclear threat from a foreign country. In December 2006, he released a memoir with his wife, author Janet Langhart, entitled Love in Black and White, a memoir about race, religion, and the love couple shares over similar life circumstances and backgrounds. He then appeared on The Daily Show (August 22, 2006) and on Fox & Friends First (August 25, 2006), where he said to host Brian Kilmeade, "I think there should be a commitment to universal service. I think that only a few people are really committed to this war against terrorism. ... We ought to have a real call to national service to commit ourselves to some form of public service ...to put us on a war footing mentality."

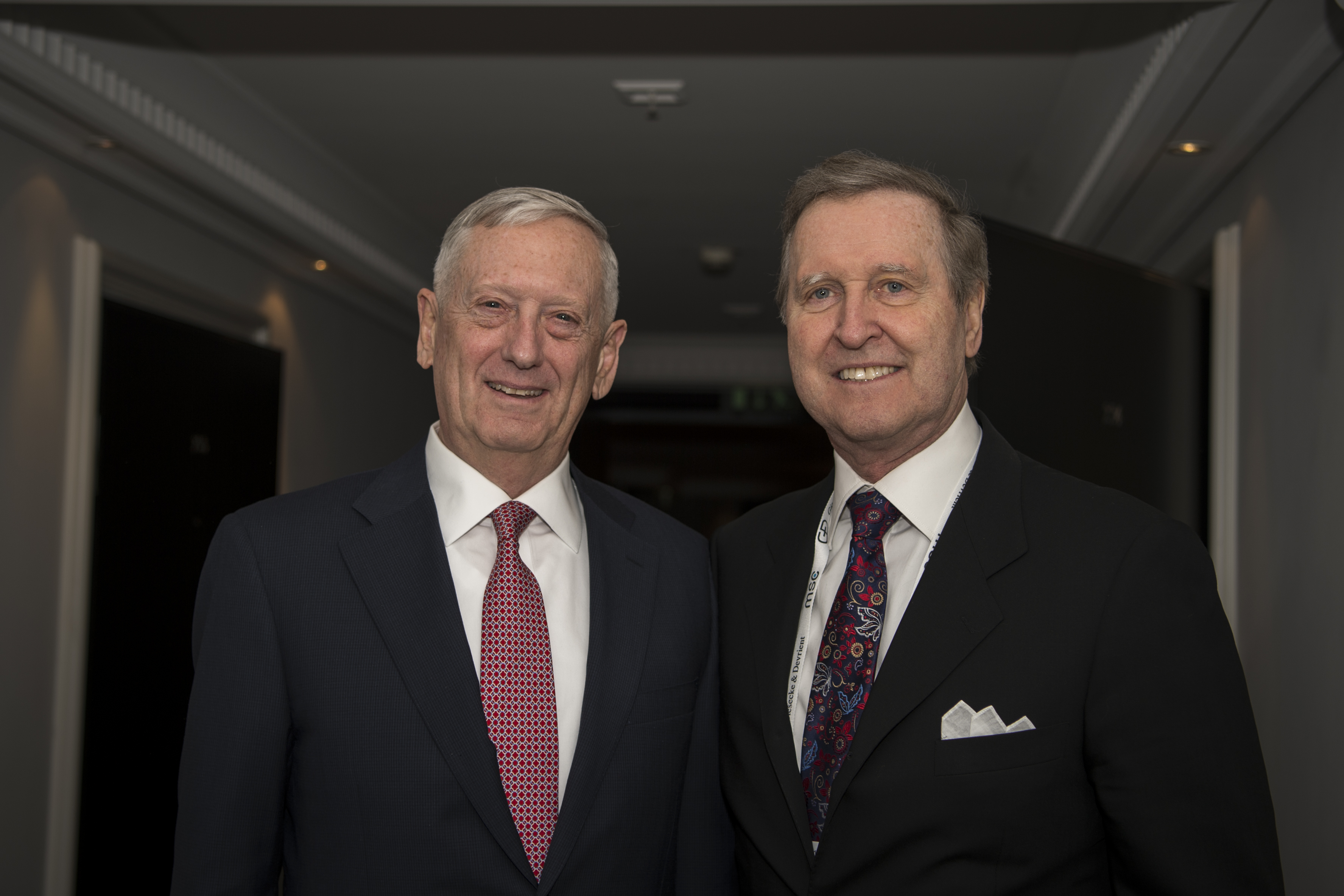
Cohen with then-Defense Secretary Jim Mattis in February 2017

BBC News hired Cohen as a world affairs analyst in May 2016. Cohen appears in this capacity on BBC World News America and other broadcasts.

Cohen and Madeleine Albright co-chaired a "Genocide Prevention Task Force". Their appointment was criticized by Harut Sassounian and by the Armenian National Committee of America.

Cohen serves as an advisory board member for the Partnership for a Secure America and is also a member of the ReFormers Caucus of Issue One. In addition, he serves as a board member of the U.S.-China Business Council, having served as vice-chairman between 2011 and 2013, and the U.S.-India Business Council.

During the 2016 presidential election, Cohen joined many other prominent Republican former elected officials in breaking with party ranks to oppose the candidacy of Republican nominee Donald Trump. He endorsed Democratic nominee former secretary of state Hillary Clinton. In the 2020 election, Cohen again announced his support for the Democratic presidential candidate, endorsing Joe Biden. However, he also endorsed incumbent Republican Maine Senator Susan Collins (who was once a member of his own Senate staff) for re-election.

Cohen, along with all of the living former secretaries of defense, ten in total, published a Washington Post op-ed piece in January 2021 telling President Trump not to involve the military in determining the outcome of the 2020 elections.

In July 2022, Cohen helped found a group of U.S. business and policy leaders who share the goal of constructively engaging with China in order to improve U.S.-China relations.

== Personal life ==
In 1987, Cohen filed for divorce from his first wife, Diana Dunn, with whom he has two sons, Kevin and Christopher. On February 14, 1996, Cohen and Janet Langhart were married. Langhart is a former model, Boston television personality, and BET correspondent. She was known as the "First Lady of the Pentagon" during Cohen's tenure as secretary.

Cohen served as best man in then-Senate Naval Liaison John McCain's second wedding (Gary Hart was a groomsman). McCain later became his Senate colleague.

According to The New York Times, Cohen was considered a loner in Congress.

He is a Unitarian Universalist. At one point in 2007, he considered reconciling with Judaism and agreed to once again attend a synagogue.

=== Attack at Holocaust Museum ===
On the afternoon of June 10, 2009, Cohen was at the U.S. Holocaust Museum waiting for his wife Janet Langhart who was to perform in the world premiere of her one-act play Anne and Emmett. The play imagines a conversation between Anne Frank and Emmett Till. While Cohen waited, an elderly man with a slide-action rifle attacked the facility, fatally shooting a security guard—Museum Special Police Officer Stephen Tyrone Johns—before the attacker himself was wounded by the other guards. Cohen and Langhart were not injured, and appeared on CNN that afternoon to tell what they had seen and respond to the shooter's racist beliefs. The man was James W. von Brunn, 88, of Annapolis, a longtime "hard-core" white supremacist whose Internet writings contain extensive criticism against Jews and African Americans. He was charged in federal court with first-degree murder and was indicted by a federal grand jury on seven counts, including hate-crime charges. Langhart's play had been promoted in The Washington Post the week before, and was being presented in honor of the eightieth anniversary of Anne Frank's birth.

== Honors ==
- Grand Cordon of the Order of the Rising Sun, Japan (2018)

== Recent publications ==
- July 7, 2009, "On Common Ground", Forbes magazine
- June 8, 2009, "Smart Power Is Soft Power", Politico
- June 3, 2009, "Nuclear Cooperation with U.A.E. in Our Interest", The Hill
- May 28, 2009, "Obama's chance to cement ties with India", Financial Times
- May 28, 2009, "No Time to Cut Missile Defense", The Washington Times
- April 23, 2009, "The World Depends on U.S.-China Cooperation", The Wall Street Journal
- September 30, 2008, "The India Nuclear Deal: The Merits", Forbes magazine
- December 30, 2007, "Changing Our Direction", www.nationalinterest.org
- August 12, 2007, "What Is This Man Thinking?", The Washington Post
- February 5, 2007, "Perfect Partners", Asian Wall Street Journal
- July 17, 2007, "Commentary: North Korea's Declaration of Independence", CNN

== See also ==
- List of United States political appointments that crossed party lines
- List of Jewish United States Cabinet members
- List of mayors of Bangor, Maine

U.S. House of Representatives
Preceded by William Hathaway	Member of the U.S. House of Representatives from Maine's 2nd congressional district 1973–1979	Succeeded by Olympia Snowe
Party political offices
Preceded by Margaret Chase Smith	Republican nominee for U.S. Senator from Maine (Class 1); 1978, 1984, 1990	Succeeded by Susan Collins
U.S. Senate
Preceded by William Hathaway	U.S. Senator (Class 2) from Maine; 1979–1997; Served alongside: Ed Muskie, George Mitchell, Olympia Snowe	Succeeded by Susan Collins
Preceded by John Melcher	Chair of the Senate Indian Affairs Committee; 1981–1983	Succeeded by Mark Andrews
Preceded by Patrick Leahy	Vice Chair of the Senate Intelligence Committee; 1987–1991	Succeeded by Frank Murkowski
Preceded by John Heinz	Ranking Member of the Senate Aging Committee; 1991–1995	Succeeded by David Pryor
Preceded by David Pryor	Chair of the Senate Aging Committee; 1995–1997	Succeeded by Chuck Grassley
Political offices
Preceded by William J. Perry	United States Secretary of Defense; 1997–2001	Succeeded by Donald Rumsfeld
Awards
Preceded by Roger Staubach	Recipient of the Theodore Roosevelt Award; 2001	Succeeded by Eunice Kennedy Shriver
U.S. order of precedence (ceremonial)
Preceded by Mickey Kantor as Former U.S. Cabinet Member	Order of precedence of the United States as Former U.S. Cabinet Member	Succeeded by Andrew Cuomo as Former U.S. Cabinet Member
