= Robert Kistner =

American physician (1917–1990)

Robert William Kistner (August 23, 1917 – February 6, 1990) was a gynecologist who specialized in the treatment of endometriosis and was involved in the early development of the birth control pill.

== Early life ==
Kistner was born in Cincinnati, Ohio, the son of Alfred and Gertrude Kistner; he graduated from the University of Cincinnati and from its medical school in 1942.

== Career ==
Following his internship at Cincinnati General Hospital (now the University of Cincinnati Medical Center), he was a resident at Johns Hopkins in Baltimore and Kings County Hospital Center in New York, before moving to Boston Hospital for Women (now Brigham and Women's Hospital). Kistner was a senior attending physician at Brigham and Women's Hospital. He was an associate clinical professor at Harvard Medical School, and specialized in surgery to correct infertility. He was previously a chief of staff at Boston Hospital for Women, and a consultant for the New England Baptist Hospital.

Kistner was named the 32nd president of the American Fertility Society in 1979. He was a member of the American College of Surgeons, and a fellow of the American College of Obstetricians and Gynecologists. He was an advocate of the first birth control pills, not only as a contraceptive, but also for protection against uterine cancer.

=== Military career ===
Kistner served in the Pacific theatre of World War II as a flight surgeon for the United States Army Air Corps, and chief of air evacuation. When the war ended, he continued consulting for the Air Force.

== Personal life ==
Kistner was married to Georgia Golde in 1943, and to Janet Langhart in 1978. He had four children with Golde: Dana, Robert Jr., Stephen, and Peter. The Boston Globe "Who's Who" in Boston medicine described Kistner in 1980 as well dressed, a "brilliant surgeon as well as researcher" and "one of the best known gynecologists in the world long before he achieved a special kind of local celebrity with his marriage".

=== Retirement and death ===
After 38 years of practicing medicine and teaching, he retired and moved to Wellington, Florida, where he died at the age of 72.

Kistner served as a trustee for Noble and Greenough School and was a member of the Harvard Club of Boston.

== Works ==
Kistner was the author of more than 175 articles and numerous books, including:

- The Pill: Facts and fallacies about today's oral contraceptives. New York: Delacorte Press. 1969. ASIN B0006C4QSO.
- Gynecology: Principles and Practice 1964. republished numerous times and widely used in medical schools.
- Atlas of infertility surgery. Little, Brown. 1975. ISBN 978-0316496704.
- Progress in Infertility. Little Brown & Co. 1987. ISBN 978-0316087759. (With Behrman SJ, edited by Patton GW.)

According to the Duka and DeCherney, among Kistner's notable journal-published research are three papers published early in his career:

- "Induction of ovulation with clomiphene citrate (clomid)" (Note: MER-25 is closely related to clomiphene citrate (Clomid) according to Kistner's 1965 review.)
- "Histological effects of progestins on hyperplasia and carcinoma in situ of the endometrium"
- "The treatment of endometriosis by inducing pseudopregnancy with ovarian hormones"

== Honors and awards ==
The Kistner Library at Brigham and Women's Hospital was dedicated after his death to his 34 years of service.
