= Tom Phardel =

American artist

Tom Phardel (born 1950) is an American artist born in Detroit to Sicilian immigrants. Some of his works and fine ceramics are owned by a number of important American institutions, including the Everson Museum in Syracuse, the Detroit Institute of Arts and the Dennos Museum Center.

He participated in many art exhibitions at: Tampa Art Museum, Joan Robey Gallery, Michigan Gallery, Mott College, Galleria (Southfield, MI), Habatat-Shaw Gallery, Detroit Institute of Arts, Pewabic Pottery, Shaw Gallery, the "Fourth Annual Michigan Outdoor Sculpture Exhibition", NECEA Conference Gallery I/O, Central Michigan University Gallery, Wayne State University Community Gallery, Detroit Contemporary, Michigan Potters Association Center Galleries - Center for Creative Studies, Krazel Art Center, Detroit Artists Market, Scrab Club, Michigan Guild Gallery, Lemberg Gallery, Canzani Center Gallery - Columbus College of Art & Design, Masonic Temple, Paint Creek Center for the Arts, 101 Up Gallery, Contemporary Institute of Detroit, The Clay Studio, Navy Pier, Faculty Now - Center Galleries, 40th NCECA National Conference, Lemberg Gallery, etc..

Sculpture: Constructed, March 24 to May 16, 2008, at Gallery One, Washtenaw Community College, Ann Arbor featured his most recent works together with the most recent ones of Sharon Que. Same for Spirit, June 25 to August 3, 2008, at Gallery Project, Ann Arbor, Michigan.

Whether working in stoneware or mixed media, Phardel's intent is also creating contemplative objects.

He is active in Ann Arbor, Michigan.
