= Zvi Zeitlin =

Russian-born American classical violinist

- Born: February 21, 1922; Dubroŭna, Belarus
- Died: May 2, 2012 (aged 90)
- Genre: Classical
- Occupations: Professor, performer
- Instrument: Violin

Zvi Zeitlin (21 February 1922 – 2 May 2012) was a Russian-born American classical violinist and teacher.

Zeitlin was born in Dubroŭna, Byelorussian Soviet Socialist Republic (now in Belarus), the son of Jewish parents: a doctor and amateur violinist, In 1924 his family was expelled from the Soviet Union after Zionist pamphlets were found in his father's possession and moved to Mandatory Palestine. His father, an amateur musician, gave him his earliest violin lessons. Zeitlin won a scholarship at the age of 11 to the Juilliard School of Music in New York, the youngest scholarship student in the institution's history. Zeitlin attended Marsha Stern Talmudical Academy. Shortly before the outbreak of World War II, he returned to Palestine, where he launched his concert career and read Judaic Studies at the Hebrew University of Jerusalem. He served in the Royal Air Force from 1943 to 1946, performing for Allied troops throughout the Middle East and Greece. He returned to Juilliard in 1947 to continue his studies, with such teachers as Sascha Jacobsen, Louis Persinger, and Ivan Galamian.

The composers Gunther Schuller, Paul Ben-Haim and Carlos Surinach composed violin concertos for Zeitlin, who premiered them. Zeitlin was the first to record George Rochberg's Caprice Variations in their entirety. He was also a particular champion of the violin concerto of Arnold Schoenberg and recorded this work commercially for Deutsche Grammophon.

In 1961, 1964, and 1969, he was a soloist with the Naumburg Orchestral Concerts, in the Naumburg Bandshell, Central Park, in the summer series.

Zeitlin taught for 45 years at the University of Rochester's Eastman School of Music, from 1967 until his death in 2012. He gave his final recital at Eastman just before his 90th birthday. During his time at Eastman, he, pianist Barry Snyder, and cellist Robert Sylvester founded the Eastman Trio, and Zeitlin performed with this trio from 1976 to 1982. He also taught summer courses at the Music Academy of the West in California, starting in 1973. From 1962 to 2002, he performed on a rare Cremonese violin by Giuseppe Guarneri del Gesù, the 1734 "Prince Doria", which was initially gifted to him by the Lionello Perera family, before switching to a replica by the contemporary American violinmaker, Gregg T. Alf.

Zeitlin and his wife Marianne Langner Zeitlin were married for 61 years. The couple had 2 children, Hillel and Leora. His widow and children, his sister Anba Kantor, and six grandchildren and two great-grandchildren survive him.
