= Joseph Curtin =

American contemporary violinmaker

- Education: Otto Erdesz
- Known for: Violinmaker
- Movement: Violin Society of America
- Awards: MacArthur Fellows Program
- Website: josephcurtinstudios.com

Joseph Curtin is an American contemporary violinmaker who lives in Ann Arbor, Michigan. He is recognised as one of the world's greatest violinmakers.

He was a 2005 recipient of a MacArthur Fellows Program "genius grant". He has also directed workshops on violin design through the Violin Society of America, a group of builders.

Curtin uses technology such as MRIs, Lasers, and other scanning devices to measure the acoustics of violins, to aid in his designs. Curtin uses the information gathered to create replicas of famous antique violins, as well as research for more avant-garde designs including instruments made out of carbon fibre.

== Early luthiery ==
Joseph first learned violin making from Otto Erdesz, who was married to his viola teacher. Erdesz gave Curtin material for his first twenty violins.

== Curtin & Alf ==
Curtin was co-founder with Gregg Alf of the firm Curtin & Alf. In 1993, a Curtin and Alf violin made for Elmar Oliveira set a record at a Sotheby's auction for the highest price paid for a violin by a living maker. Alf and Curtin dissolved their partnership after twelve years, but occasionally collaborate on a project together.

== Study: Player preferences amongst, and identification of, new vs old violins ==
In 2010, Caudia Fritz and Curtin organized a double-blind study which was published in the Proceedings of the National Academy of Sciences in which 21 professional violinists tried to identify which violins were old (including 2 Stradivarius and a Guarneri), and which were new, and which they preferred. 13 of the 21 violinists preferred the new violins. One of the Stradivarius violins was the least preferred. The violinists could not reliably identify which instruments were old, and which were new.

Earl Carlyss, a member of the Juilliard String Quartet, was critical of the study saying "It’s a totally inappropriate way of finding out the quality of these instruments", and that what makes the older violins better is how they sound to an audience in a concert hall, not if the violinist likes it, in a hotel room.

John Soloninka, who was one of the violinists who played in the study, said "It was fascinating. I too, expected to be able to tell the difference, but could not" and that "If, after this, you cling to picayune critiques and dismiss the study, then I think you are in denial. If 21 of us could not tell in controlled circumstances and 1500 people could not tell any differences in a hall, and this is consistent with past studies...then it is time to put the myths out to pasture."

In a similar 1977 experiment, Isaac Stern and Pinchas Zukerman and a classical violin dealer Charles Beare listened to a Stradivarius, a Guarneri, and a (then modern) 1976 British violin. They were also unable to identify which instrument was which, and two of them mistakenly identified the 1976 violin as the Stradivarius.

== Digital recreation of violin sound ==
Curtin worked with Gabi Weinreich, John Bell and Alex Sobolev to capture the sound characteristics of many classic violins. They used this data to create a signal processor, that could convert the sound produced by a standard digital violin, and make it sound like a Stradivarius or other classic violin. Neuroscientist Daniel Levitin and author of "This is your brain on music" was presented with recordings of an actual Stradivarius and a recording of a processed violin, and guessed incorrectly as to which was the classic violin.

== Notable players ==
The following are notable violinists who use or have used violins made by Joseph Curtin.

- Nikki Chooi
- Joshua Coyne
- Erick Friedman
- Ilya Kaler
- Donald McInnes
- Yehudi Menuhin
- Takako Nishizaki
- Elmar Oliveira
- Ruggiero Ricci
