= Gregg Alf =

Contemporary American violin maker (born 1957)

Gregg T. Alf (born 1957, Los Angeles) is a prominent contemporary American violin maker based in Ann Arbor, Michigan.

Replicas of classic Italian instruments formed the basis of his early work. Since 1996 he has been a member and facilitator of the Oberlin Summer Violin Making Workshops. In recent years he has become a recognized expert on the acoustical properties of violins. He has also received awards from the Violin Society of America for his work.

== Biography ==
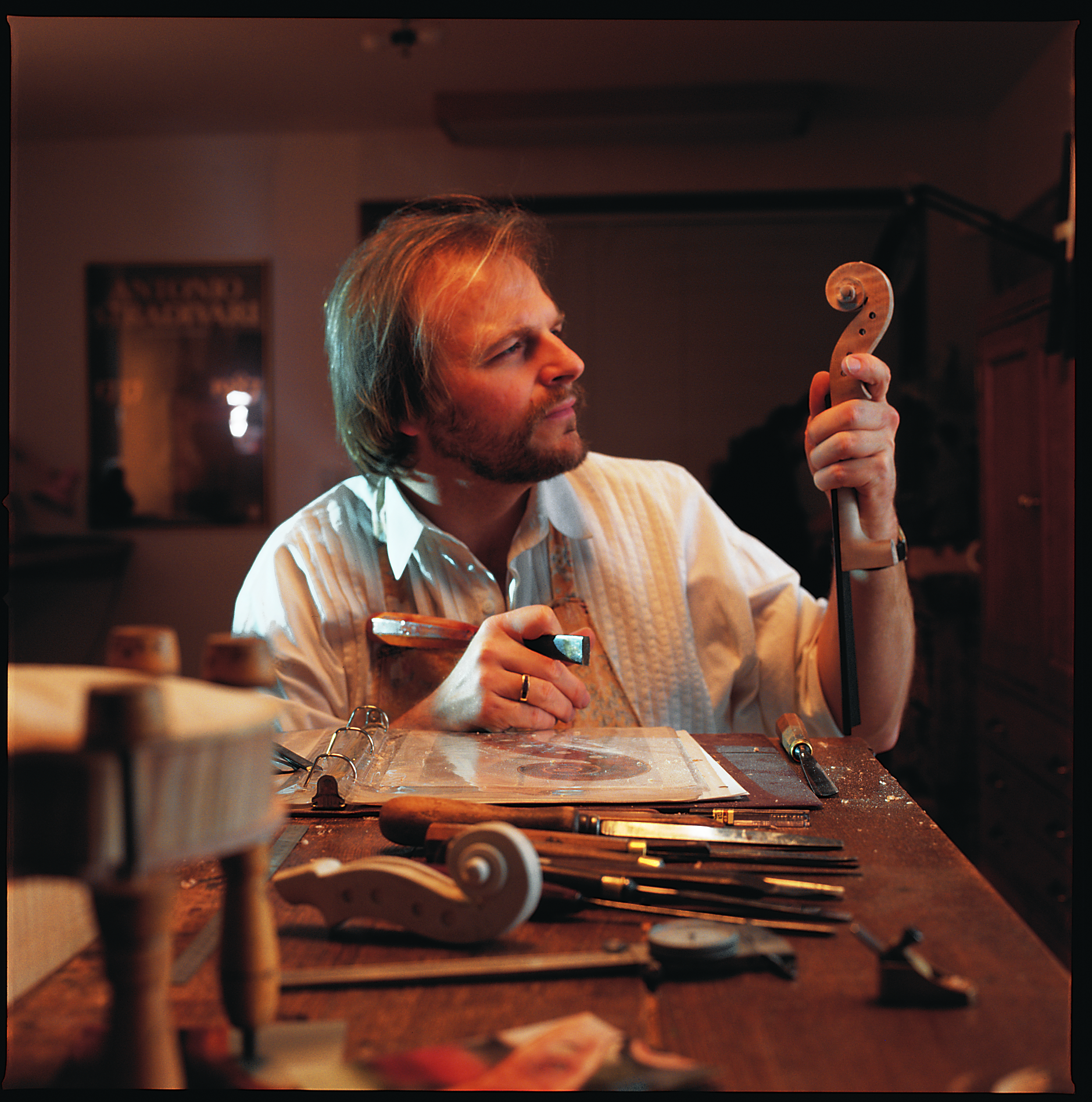

Born to an artistic family in Los Angeles on January 30, 1957, Musically inclined, he studied the violin as a child and made his first violin in 1975. Later, he spent eight years in Cremona, Italy, where he graduated from the International Violin Making School and established a growing reputation for his work.

At age 19, he moved to Cremona, Italy where over the course of eight years he graduated from the Cremona International Violinmaking School “Antonio Stradivari” in 1980.

In 1982, Gregg was awarded Hors Concours by Violin Society of America. His instruments were presented at the Ole Bull celebration in Bergen Norway and are in loan collections offered by the Royal Academy of London, the Amati Foundation, Dextra Musica and the Maestro Foundation.

In 1984, Gregg returned to the United States, and together with Joseph Curtin, founded the violin-making studios of Curtin & Alf. Alf and Curtin dissolved their partnership in 1996, but have continued to collaborate occasionally. This partnership attracted the from violin world, including Elmar Oliveira, Ruggiero Ricci, and Zvi Zeitlin. In 1993, a Curtin and Alf violin made for Oliveira set a record at a Sotheby's auction for the highest price paid for a violin by a living maker. In 1997, he opened an Alf Studios at the same location in Ann Arbor, which continues to this day in Ann Arbor, Michigan.

Gregg holds membership in the Violin Society of America, the American Federation of Violin and Bow Makers, the British Violin Making Association and the Entente Internationale des Luthiers et Archetiers d’Art. He has served on the faculty of the Oberlin Violinmaking Workshops for many years and was a frequent workmanship judge for the VSA’s Violinmaking Competitions, the Cremona Triennale, the First China International Violinmaking Competition, and others. In 2011 he served on the Scientific Committee of the Guadagnini Exhibition in Parma, Italy. Gregg currently works on the Scientific Committee of the Cremona Museo del Violino, and in recent years has curated several exhibitions including the 2016 Messiah Stradivari Exhibition in Cremona and the Tokyo Stradivarius Festival, 2018.
