= United States Holocaust Memorial Museum shooting =

2009 terrorist attack in Washington, D.C.

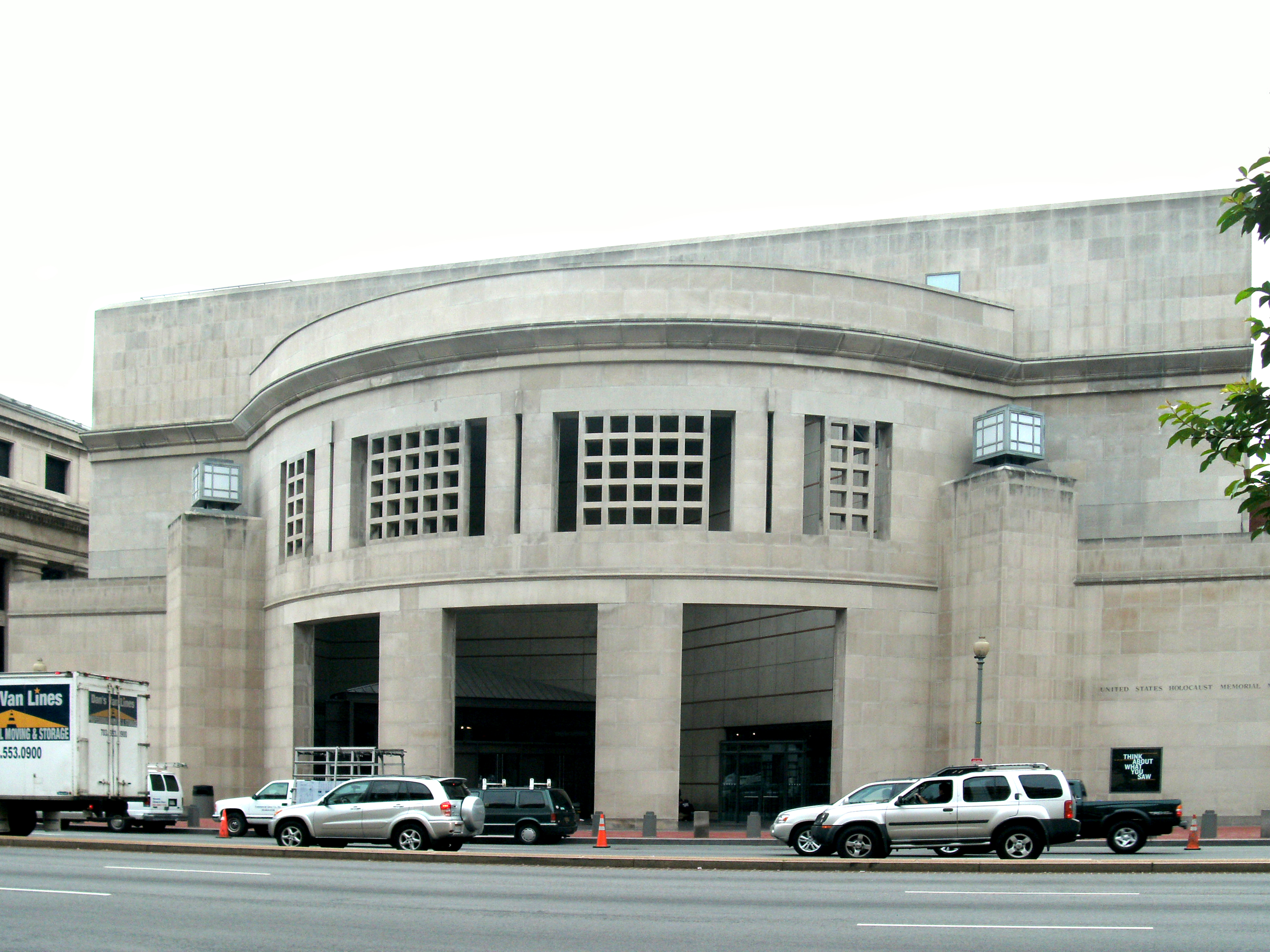
- The United States Holocaust Memorial Museum on the day after the shooting.
- Location: United States Holocaust Memorial Museum in Washington, D.C.
- Date: June 10, 2009; 12:50 p.m. (EDT)
- Attack type: Murder by shooting, hate crime
- Weapon: Winchester Model 1906 .22-caliber rifle
- Deaths: 1
- Injuries: 2 (including the perpetrator)
- Perpetrator: James Wenneker von Brunn
- Motive: Antisemitism, Holocaust denial

At approximately 12:50 p.m. on June 10, 2009, 88-year-old James Wenneker von Brunn entered the United States Holocaust Memorial Museum in Washington, D.C., with a slide-action rifle and fatally shot Museum Special Police Officer Stephen Tyrone Johns. Other special police officers returned fire, wounding von Brunn, who was apprehended.

Von Brunn was charged in federal court on June 11, 2009, with first-degree murder and firearms violations. On July 29, 2009, von Brunn was indicted by a federal grand jury on seven counts. Included in the indictment were three hate crime charges, as well as four charges which made him eligible for the death penalty. In September 2009, a judge ordered von Brunn to undergo a competency evaluation to determine whether or not he could stand trial. On January 6, 2010, von Brunn died of natural causes while awaiting trial.

Von Brunn was a white supremacist, Holocaust denier, and neo-Nazi. He had previously been convicted of entering the Federal Reserve Building with various weapons in 1981 and attempting to place the members of the Federal Reserve Board of Governors, who he considered to be treasonous, under citizen's arrest.

== Background ==
The Holocaust Museum has previously been a target of white supremacist terrorism since its establishment in 1993. In 2002, two white supremacists plotted to attack the museum using a fertilizer bomb, though their plan was foiled by their arrest.

== Shooting ==
At about 12:49 p.m., 88-year-old James von Brunn drove his car to the 14th Street entrance of the museum. Von Brunn entered the museum when Museum Special Police Officer Stephen Tyrone Johns opened the door for him. Inside, the museum was crowded with visiting schoolchildren. Also present at the museum during the shooting was former United States Secretary of Defense William Cohen, awaiting his wife Janet Langhart; the two were at the museum for the premiere of Langhart's one-act play, Anne and Emmett. The play imagines a conversation between two teenagers, Nazi victim Anne Frank and Jim Crow victim Emmett Till. Her play was to be presented in honor of the eightieth anniversary of Anne Frank's birth.

Authorities said he raised a Winchester Model 1906 .22-caliber rifle and shot Special Police Officer Johns once in the upper torso; Johns later died of his injuries at the George Washington University Hospital.

Two other Special Police Officers stationed with Officer Johns, Harry Weeks and Jason "Mac" McCuiston, then exchanged fire with von Brunn, wounding him with a shot to the face. According to police officers at the scene, a third person was injured by broken glass but refused treatment at the hospital.

In total, 11 shots were fired during the incident (three from von Brunn and eight from Weeks and McCuiston). Museum officials said that "the entire incident unfolded in approximately two minutes."

== Aftermath ==
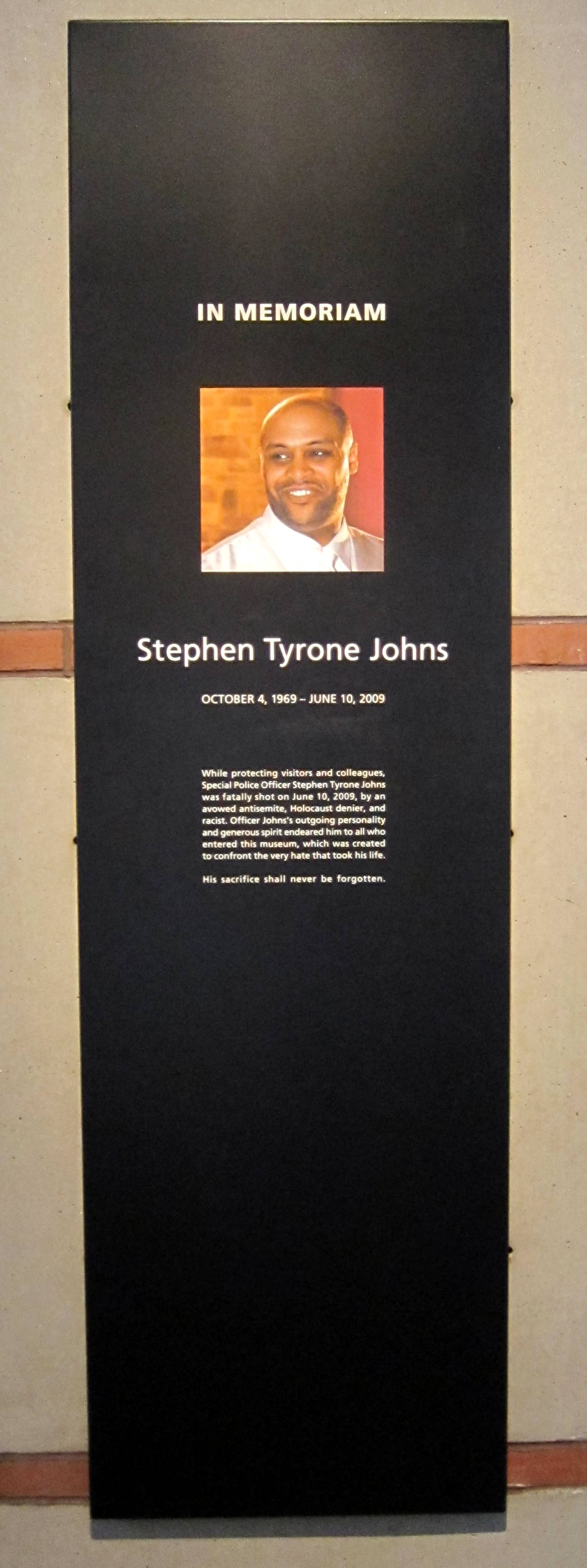
A sign honoring Stephen Tyrone Johns, the Special Police Officer shot and killed during the shooting, located in the museum's lobby.

The Washington Post reported that "if it weren't for the quick response of the private guards on duty, more people could have been killed or wounded." Mayor Adrian Fenty stated that the officers' efforts "to bring this gunman down so quickly ... saved the lives of countless people... This could have been much, much worse."

After the shooting, the nearby U.S. Department of Agriculture Administration Building, Bureau of Engraving and Printing, and the USDA's Sidney R. Yates Federal Building were closed. Portions of 14th Street and Independence Avenue in the Southwest quadrant were closed until later in the night. The car driven by von Brunn was found double-parked in front of the museum and tested for explosives.

The FBI and Washington, D.C. police chief Cathy L. Lanier said that it appeared von Brunn was acting alone at the time of the shooting, and the FBI said it had no knowledge of any threat against the museum. The museum's director of security said they receive threats, but "nothing this significant recently".

== Victim ==
Special Police Officer Stephen Tyrone Johns (October 4, 1969 – June 10, 2009), a Temple Hills, Maryland native, was an employee of Wackenhut who was, at the time of the shooting, stationed at the door of the museum when von Brunn entered with a .22 caliber long rifle and shot him. He later died at the George Washington University Hospital. His funeral was held on June 19, 2009, at Ebenezer AME Church in Fort Washington, Maryland, with 2,000 attendees, and he was subsequently interred. The American Jewish Committee established a memorial fund for the family.

== Investigation and legal ==
After the shooting, federal authorities raided his apartment and seized a rifle, ammunition, computers, a handwritten will, and a painting of Jesus Christ standing adjacent to Adolf Hitler. The FBI also stated it discovered child pornography on one of the seized computers.

Von Brunn was charged in federal court on June 11, 2009, with first-degree murder and firearms violations; he pleaded not guilty to all of the charges. On July 29, 2009, von Brunn was indicted on seven counts, including four which made him eligible for the death penalty. In September 2009, a judge ordered von Brunn to undergo a competency evaluation to determine whether or not he could stand trial.

=== Potential motives ===
Police said they found a notebook on von Brunn that contained a list of District locations, including the Washington National Cathedral; they dispatched bomb squads to at least 10 sites. The notebook also contained this passage, signed by von Brunn: "You want my weapons—this is how you'll get them. The Holocaust is a lie. Obama was created by Jews. Obama does what his Jew owners tell him to do. Jews captured America's money. Jews control the mass media. The 1st Amendment is abrogated henceforth."

Several news agencies have noted the timing of the June 10 shooting; it came shortly after Obama's June 5 visit to and speech at the Buchenwald concentration camp, and that "President Obama’s recent visit to the Buchenwald Concentration Camp, in Germany, may have set off the shooter."

On his website, von Brunn stated that his conviction in the 1980s was by "a Negro jury, Jew/Negro attorneys" and that he was "sentenced to prison for eleven years by a Jew judge." A Court of Appeals denied his appeal.

== Perpetrator ==
James von Brunn
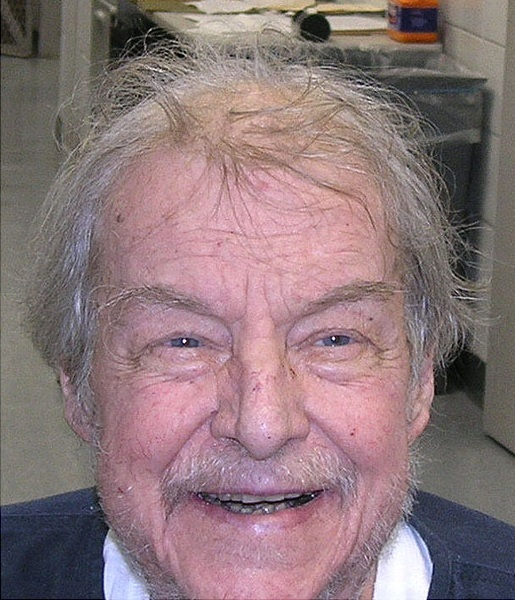
- Mug shot of von Brunn taken in 2009
- Born: James Wenneker von Brunn; July 11, 1920; St. Louis, Missouri, U.S.
- Died: January 6, 2010 (aged 89); Butner, North Carolina, U.S.
- Occupations: Advertising executive and producer, author
- Status: Deceased
- Convictions: Burglary, assault, weapons charges, and attempted kidnapping
- Penalty: Imprisonment of six and a half years

Von Brunn was born in St. Louis, Missouri, the first of two children. His father was a native of Houston, Texas, and a superintendent at the Scullin Steel Mill in Houston during World War II. His mother was a piano teacher and homemaker.

Von Brunn enrolled in Washington University in St. Louis in August 1938, and received his Bachelor of Science degree in journalism in April 1943. During his time at the university, von Brunn was said to have been president of the Sigma Alpha Epsilon chapter, and a varsity football player. He served in the United States Navy from 1943 to 1957, and was the commanding officer of PT boat 159 during the Pacific Theatre of World War II, receiving a commendation and three battle stars. Von Brunn had worked as an advertising executive and producer in New York City for twenty years. In the late 1960s, he relocated to the Eastern Shore of Maryland, where he continued to do advertising work and resumed painting.

In the years after the war, numerous people who were associated with Von Brunn said that he regularly complained that the United States had fought on the wrong side in the Second World War. Terry Martin, a William Woods art professor who met Von Brunn, said:

"He said he fought for the wrong side. He said everything in this country wasn’t what he fought for; everything was upside down. He didn't like minorities."

In the early 1970s, Von Brunn briefly worked for Noontide Press, the publishing arm of the Holocaust-denying Institute for Historical Review.

Von Brunn's arrest history dates back at least as far as the mid-1960s. In 1968, he received a six-month jail sentence in Maryland for fighting with a sheriff during an incident at the county jail. He had earlier been arrested for driving under the influence following an altercation at a local restaurant in 1966.

Von Brunn was arrested in 1981 for attempted kidnapping and hostage-taking of members of the Federal Reserve Board of Governors after approaching the Federal Reserve's Eccles Building armed with a revolver, knife, and sawed-off shotgun. Von Brunn later described his actions as a "citizen's arrest for treason." He reportedly complained of "high interest rates" during the incident and was disarmed without any shots being fired, after threatening a security guard with a .38 caliber pistol. He reportedly claimed he had a bomb, which was found to be only a device designed to look like a bomb. He was convicted in 1983 for burglary, assault, weapons charges, and attempted kidnapping. Von Brunn's sentence was completed by September 15, 1989, after he had served six and a half years in prison. After he was released he successfully tested for and joined Mensa International; however, he was eventually dropped from membership for failing to pay his annual dues.

Von Brunn was a member of the American Friends of the British National Party, a group that raised funds in the United States for the far right and "rights for whites" British National Party (BNP). The group had been addressed on at least two occasions by Nick Griffin, an ex-member of the National Front and chairman of the BNP. A BNP spokesperson claimed after the shooting that the party had "never heard of" von Brunn.

In 2004 and 2005 he lived in Hayden Lake, Idaho, the town where Aryan Nations—a neo-Nazi organization led by Richard Butler—was based until 2001. Von Brunn was living in Annapolis, Maryland at the time of the incident.

Von Brunn had the Federal Bureau of Prisons ID# 07128-016 and was incarcerated at the Federal Correctional Complex in Butner, North Carolina. On January 6, 2010, von Brunn died in a hospital located near the prison while awaiting trial. According to a statement by his attorney, von Brunn had "a long history of poor health," including Sepsis and chronic Congestive heart disease.

== Reaction ==
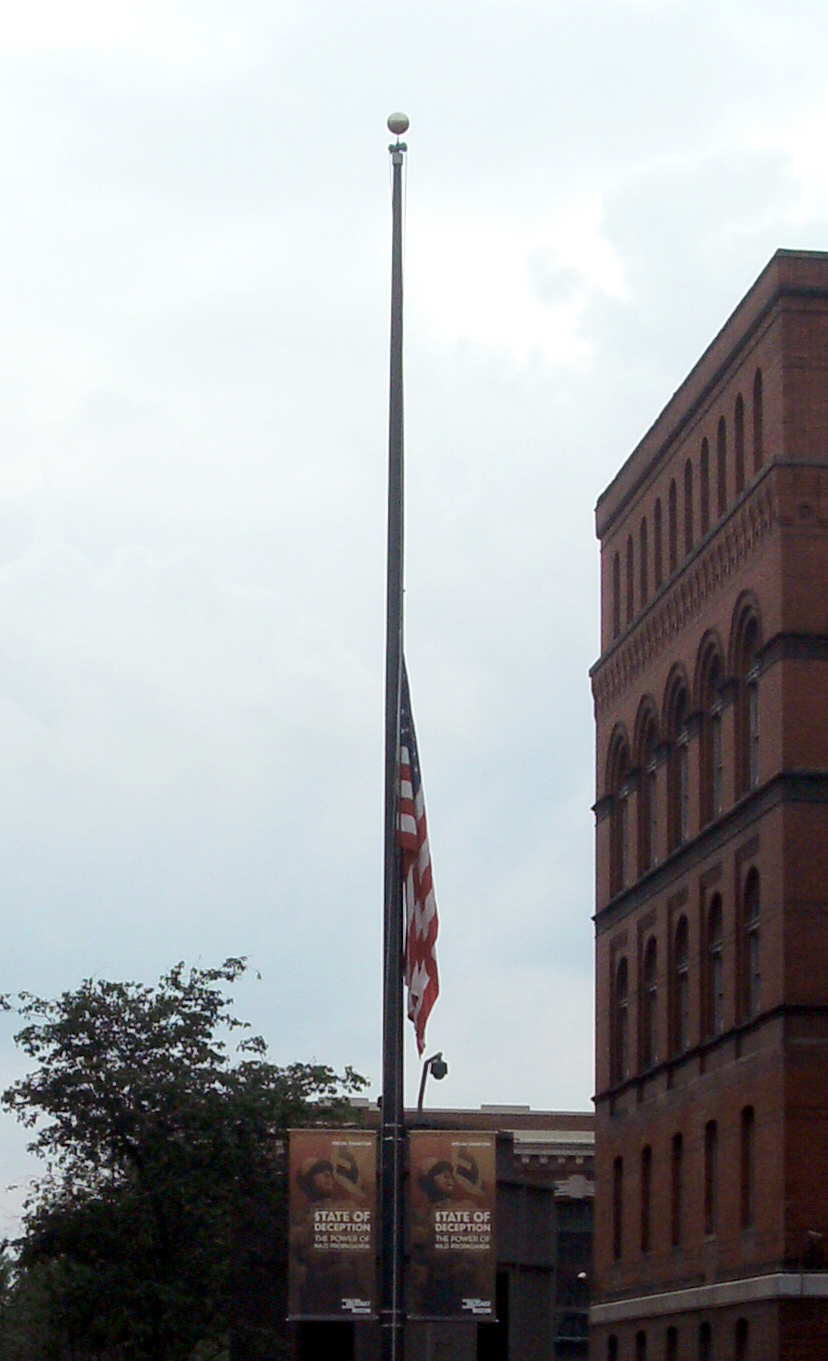
The day after the shooting, the Holocaust Museum's flag flew at half-staff in memory of the murdered guard, Stephen Tyrone Johns.

The Israeli embassy in Washington condemned the attack. U.S. President Barack Obama said, "This outrageous act reminds us that we must remain vigilant against anti-Semitism and prejudice in all its forms."

The Southern Poverty Law Center, Anti-Defamation League, and FBI stated they had been monitoring von Brunn's Internet postings, but were unable to take action because his comments had not crossed the line from free speech into illegal threats or incitement.

On June 11, 2009, the Jewish Community Relations Council of Greater Washington and the InterFaith Conference of Metropolitan Washington led a prayer vigil that took place in front of the museum to honor Stephen Johns, the slain officer. Approximately 100 people attended the event, including officials from the Israeli and German embassies. The Council on American–Islamic Relations condemned the attack as well. When the museum reopened on June 12, 2009, Director Sara Bloomfield said attendance was normal or even higher than usual. Many visitors said their attendance was a statement against hate and intolerance. A 17-year-old girl who was in the museum the day of the shooting said, "It's important to come back, because if you don't, they win. It's a form of terrorism."

On the white nationalist Internet forum Stormfront, some users criticized von Brunn's actions, saying they hurt the forum's cause. Others supported him in threads that were later removed, some of which later reappeared.

== See also ==
- Antisemitism in the United States
- List of attacks on Jewish institutions
