= Janet Langhart =

American television journalist and anchor (born 1941)

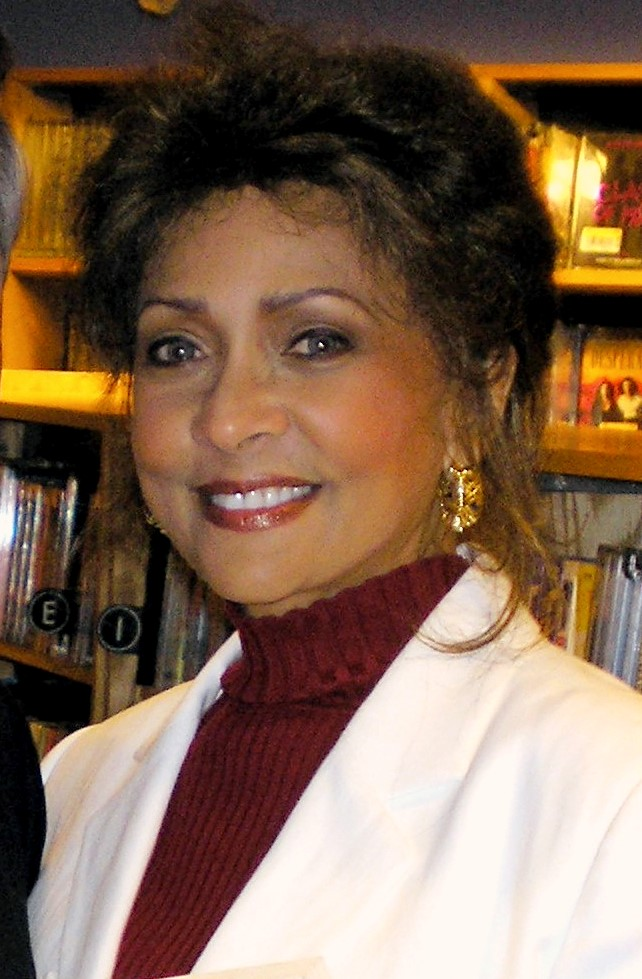
- Janet Langhart in New York City, 2006
- Born: Janet Leola Floyd; December 22, 1941 (age 84); Indianapolis, Indiana, U.S.
- Occupations: Writer, journalist
- Spouses: Melvin Anthony Langhart (m. 1968; div. 1969) Robert Kistner (m. 1978; div. 1989) William Cohen (m. 1996)

Janet Leola Langhart Cohen (née Floyd; born December 22, 1941) is an American television journalist and anchor, and author. Beginning her career as a model, she started in television reporting the weather.

She serves as president and CEO of Langhart Communication. She is the spouse of former Defense Secretary William Cohen. She has written two memoirs, one with her husband. In June 2009, her one-act play Anne and Emmett, inspired by the lives of Anne Frank and Emmett Till, premiered at the United States Holocaust Museum.

== Early life and education ==
She was born as Janet Leola Floyd in Indianapolis, Indiana in 1941. She and her mother Mary Floyd lived in an Indianapolis housing project; her mother worked as a maid and hospital ward secretary. Both her parents were African-American; they also had European and Native American ancestry. Her mother, Mary, and her father, Sewell Bridges, had formed a relationship at a young age but they never married. Bridges served in World War II and abandoned his family after the war. Her mother married a Baptist preacher, but they ultimately divorced. Janet and her brother and sister were raised by their mother.

In 1959, Janet Floyd earned her high school diploma from Crispus Attucks High School in Indianapolis. She was a member of the band and debate team. From 1960 until 1962, she attended Butler University. But after attending Butler for her freshman year, her scholarship money expired, and she was unable to continue; she then took some extension courses at Indiana University, before going to work full-time.

== Marriages and family ==
Floyd married Melvin Anthony Langhart in 1968; but the marriage was brief, lasting only three months. Her second marriage was to Dr. Robert Kistner, a Harvard Medical School professor who specialized in the treatment of endometriosis. The two were married in 1978, and Langhart filed for divorce a decade later. She married Senator William Cohen in 1996.

== Media career ==
In 1962, Langhart began her career in Chicago as a model, where she worked for Marshall Field's and the Ebony Fashion Fair. She won the title of Miss Chicagoland in 1967. At the age of 29, Langhart became the first black "weathergirl" for WBBM-TV in 1970, having previously been the "weather gal" at channel 26, WCIU. Around this time, she also began hosting an early morning interview program for women on WISH-TV in Indianapolis; it was called "Indy Today." Doing both shows made it necessary for her to commute between Indianapolis and Chicago.

Langhart became a well-known black television journalist at numerous stations. She joined Boston's WCVB-TV for the first time in September 1973, where she co-hosted the morning program Good Day! (originally titled Good Morning!). She would leave and return several times between 1973 and 1987. By 1976, Good Day was being syndicated to 75 television stations across the United States. She became known for her interviews with celebrities and news-makers. Among the famous people with whom she spoke were contralto Marian Anderson, jazz star Louis Armstrong, and popular singer Tony Bennett, as well as Rosa Parks and David Duke. She became friends with comedian Dick Gregory, Muhammad Ali and F. Lee Bailey, and she has said her mentors include civil rights leaders Melnea Cass and Martin Luther King Jr.

She was hired by NBC in mid-1978, and relocated to New York to host a daily talk and interview show called People to People. But the new show was soon renamed America Alive, and Langhart became a roving correspondent and co-host, along with Bruce Jenner and Pat Mitchell, rather than doing her own program. A few critics thought the program had potential, but most of the critics thought it was unwatchable; one called it "superficial" and "tacky", and another said it was a "dud" that deserved to "get the gong." Viewers did not embrace the show either, resulting in America Alive getting canceled after only six months. After that, Langhart worked on a television show at WOR-TV in New York City called 9 Broadcast Plaza alongside Richard Bey. She returned to Boston television, producing some special programming for WNEV-TV (channel 7). She then briefly rejoined WCVB-TV (Channel 5), making some appearances on Good Day. In 1989, she began doing segments for Entertainment Tonight and by early 1990, the show named her its New York correspondent. But Langhart was later fired from Entertainment Tonight, which she believed was because she asked Arnold Schwarzenegger, about his father Gustav Schwarzenegger's Nazi background, apparently violating an agreement he had with producers. "I was terminated by The Terminator", she remarked. Later, she was a commentator on Black Entertainment Television (BET). She has also worked as a correspondent for the Boston Herald, and the Boston Globe. She has been a spokeswoman for U.S. News & World Report and Avon Cosmetics. Politically, she says she identifies as a liberal Democrat.

=== Marriage to Cohen and Pentagon life ===
Langhart met William Cohen during a long-distance interview when she was based in Boston and he was a Congressman from Maine. They did not meet in person until she worked for BET in Washington, D.C.; Andrew Young set up an interview for her with Cohen. They remained friends. They began dating after each divorced. The couple married in the United States Capitol on Valentine's Day 1996. Cohen, a moderate Republican, was appointed by President Bill Clinton as his Secretary of Defense.

When William Cohen became Secretary of Defense, Langhart-Cohen became known as "First Lady of the Pentagon." She had a visible public role while Cohen was in office. She spurred several initiatives to support the morale and well-being of military and civilian employees of the Defense Department, including the Military Family Forum, the Pentagon Pops concert series, the Secretary of Defense Annual Holiday Tour (an entertainment revue), and her series of interviews on Pentagon TV, Special Assignment. She was given a volunteer position as "First Lady of the USO" and helped recruit celebrities and civilians to work with the United Service Organizations.

In 1999, Langhart-Cohen founded the Citizen Patriot Organization (CPO), a non-profit dedicated to recognizing "those who serve, protect, and defend the United States of America". The group periodically presents a CPO Award. The award has been given to Jack Valenti and John McCain. The group has also organized events including a Homeland Defense Tour. This brought appreciation events to first responders at the September 11 attacks sites and other domestic locations, and a Citizen Patriot tour to military locations overseas.

== Writing ==
Langhart is the author of a memoir, My Life in Two Americas; From Rage to Reason (2004). She and her husband William together wrote a joint memoir, Love in Black and White (2007). It explores race, religion, and the bonds that Langhart and Cohen share through similar life circumstances and backgrounds.

Langhart wrote Anne and Emmett, a one-act play that imagines a conversation between Anne Frank, a German Jew who died in a Nazi concentration camp, and Emmett Till, an African American from Chicago who was lynched in a small town in the Mississippi Delta. They were both young teenagers at their deaths. It premiered in 2009.

== Holocaust Museum shooting ==
On the afternoon of June 10, 2009, Langhart was on her way to the United States Holocaust Memorial Museum for the premiere of her play, Anne and Emmett. It was to be presented in honor of the 80th anniversary of Anne Frank's birth. Her husband William Cohen was waiting for her at the museum.

The premiere was cancelled after 88-year-old James Wenneker von Brunn fatally shot a security guard. Langhart and her husband appeared on CNN that afternoon to describe what they had seen.

== Sources ==
- (Langhart) Cohen, William and Janet (2007). Love in Black and White: A Memoir of Race, Religion, and Romance. Rowman & Littlefield Publishers, Inc. p. 373. ISBN 978-0-7425-5821-2.
- Langhart, Janet (2004). My Life in Two Americas; From Rage to Reason. New York: Kensington. p. 336. ISBN 978-0-7582-0393-9.
