= Anne and Emmett =

Play written by Janet Langhart

Anne and Emmett is a play by the American Janet Langhart Cohen. It explores an imaginary conversation between Emmett Till, an African-American, and Anne Frank, a German-Dutch Jew, which takes place in Memory, a non-specific afterlife or alternative dimension. They were killed as young teenagers because of racial persecution. The play recounts the lives of Till and Frank, comparing and contrasting the events in their lives and deaths.

The show features recorded narration by Morgan Freeman, and a score by Joshua Coyne.

== Shooting ==
On June 10, 2009, a planned premiere at the United States Holocaust Memorial Museum in Washington, D.C. as part of the commemoration of Frank's 80th birthday was cancelled because of a shooting at the museum, which resulted in the death of a museum guard.

== Use in training police ==
The New York City Police Department has had the play produced for audiences of its police officers, using it to teach tolerance.
