= The Violin Society of America =

The Violin Society of America (VSA) is an American organization devoted to makers and dealers of violins, violas, and cellos. It is also open to players of these instruments.

It was founded in 1973 by Herbert Goodkind and others, and formerly based in Poughkeepsie, New York. It is now based in Dallas, Texas.

The society has held an annual convention each year since 1974. It publishes The Journal of the Violin Society of America three times a year.
