= Roy Charles Gamble =

American painter

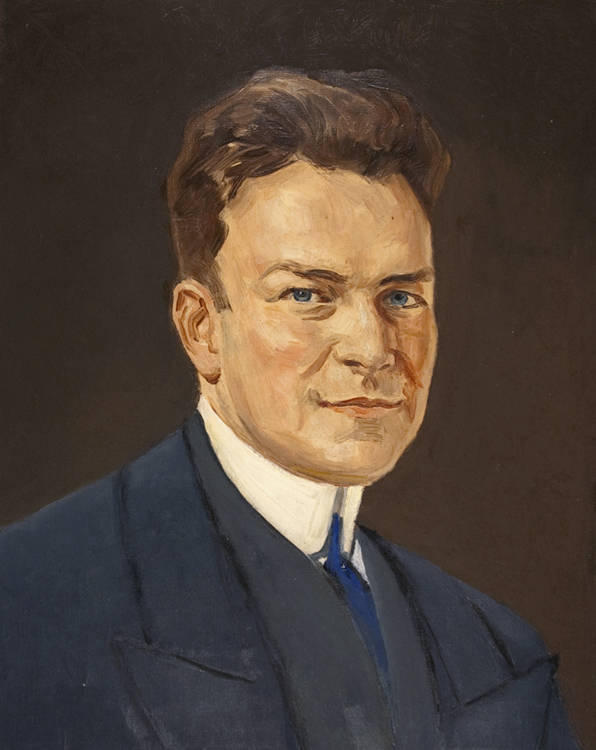
- Self portrait, ca. 1930
- Born: July 12, 1887; Detroit, Michigan, U.S.
- Died: March 30, 1972 (aged 84); Detroit, Michigan, U.S.
- Occupations: Artist, painter, portraitist
- Known for: Murals, portraits of noted U.S. jurists

Roy Charles Gamble (July 12, 1887 – March 30, 1972) was an American impressionist painter, muralist, and portraitist born in Detroit, Michigan.

== Early life and education ==
Gamble was born into a family of five children – four brothers and one sister – of whom he was the eldest, to the union of George Gamble and Lena Gamble. His father was of Irish descent and had immigrated to America from England. His mother was of German descent and a native of Canada. His father, an accomplished brick mason, built the family home located on 14th Street in the central section of Detroit where it remains to this day, and in which Roy resided, along with his brother Marshall, until his death.

His studies in the fine arts began during his senior year of high school under renowned Detroit Artist Joseph Gies, continuing at the Detroit School of Fine Arts where Gies was on the faculty, and which was headed by nationally known art educator John P. Wicker. His studies in the fine arts took him to New York City as well as Paris, France where many of his works were exhibited at the world famous Paris Salon, and where he associated with the Left Bank movement which included world renowned artists Pablo Picasso and Henri Matisse, among others. In New York he entered the Art Students League of New York where he studied under renowned artists William Merritt Chase, Jean-Paul Laurens, and Robert Henri.

The major influences on his work were American Impressionism, Classicism, French Post-Impressionist, Social Realism and Ashcan School ideologies. He also acknowledged the influence of James Abbott McNeill Whistler. In Paris he studied at the prestigious Académie Julian of Rue du Dragon and the Académie de la Grande Chaumière, both schools being situated in the 6th Arrondissement of Paris on the world famous Left Bank of the River Seine. There the young Gamble also socialized with legendary members of what came to be known as the Parisian avant-garde, among which were celebrated novelist Gertrude Stein and her brother Leo Stein, a well-known art critic.

== Career ==
Gamble initially had an interest in commercial art and in fact did work for a while as an illustrator with the O.J. Mulford Advertising Company, becoming head of the advertising department where he oversaw production of illustrations of automobiles for marketing within the Detroit-based automobile industry. Upon returning home to his native Detroit from studies in Europe he began serious work as a portrait artist, managing to earn a living doing so there throughout the Great Depression. Rather than labor for the New Deal Works Progress Administration, a public works initiative of President Franklin Delano Roosevelt during the Great Depression era, nor within the acclaimed Social Realist style of that era, Gamble continued work as a self-supporting portraitist, becoming very successful.

Gamble was an early member of Detroit's internationally known Scarab Club which counted among its notable members and correspondents, Detroit Institute of Arts secretary and curator Clyde Huntley Burroughs, Ford Motor Company President and patron of the arts Edsel Ford, renowned Detroit architect Albert Kahn, nationally known illustrator Norman Rockwell, and world famous Mexican muralist Diego Rivera. It was Rivera who was selected to paint the Detroit Industry Murals for the Detroit Institute of Art, commissioned in 1932 by DIA Director Wilhelm Reinhold Valentiner, and funded by Edsel Ford.

Over his fifty-year career, Gamble painted a long list of noteworthy figures and civic leaders including Detroit Tigers legend Ty Cobb and former Detroit Mayor Albert E. Cobo. Yet another of his most notable portraits was that of Associate Justice of the U.S. Supreme Court Frank Murphy. Justice Murphy had previously served as Governor of the State of Michigan and as Mayor of the City of Detroit. The Michigan State Capitol building houses four official portraits painted by Gamble. The Michigan Supreme Court Hall of Justice building contains a total of nine. Counted among these are the official portraits of Justice Howard Wiest, Justice Leland W. Carr, and Chief Justice of the Michigan Supreme Court, Louis H. Fead.

Within the Art Collection housed at Wayne State University in Detroit there are twenty-two of Gamble's works, including a portrait of the first Dean of that institution, renowned Detroit educator David Mackenzie. Mackenzie had previously been Principal at Detroit's Central High School on Cass Avenue from 1904 to 1919, the very school from which Gamble himself had graduated in 1906. The former David Mackenzie High School located on Wyoming Avenue in Detroit was also named in his honor. The original Central High School building, which opened its doors in 1894, now serves as the signature Old Main on the WSU campus, and currently houses the College of Liberal Arts and Sciences.

== Military service ==
"In the fall of 1917 Gamble traveled to France yet again, this time in service to a hospital unit during World War I. There he worked to serve wounded Italian, French, British and American soldiers. A letter he wrote to his mother was published in the Detroit Free Press in 1918 describing [the] shelling and his hopefulness that the tide was turning in the Allies favor over the Germans. The Central High School June class of 1918 and the alumni association requested Gamble paint a mural to commemorate the fallen classmates of Central High." Wayne State University, University Art Collection.

"[Roy] Gamble saw action with the armed forces during WWI, yet never gave up his painting, nor did he lose his faith in his chosen path as a Jehovah's Witness. Finding joy in his art, faith in his beliefs, and fame and respect in his circle of artistic peers, Roy Gamble made a life for himself and touched the lives of those who knew him in the best of all possible worlds." Biographical highlights from the Scarab Bulletin, December 1960.

Artist Roy C. Gamble died in his native Detroit in 1972 at age 84.

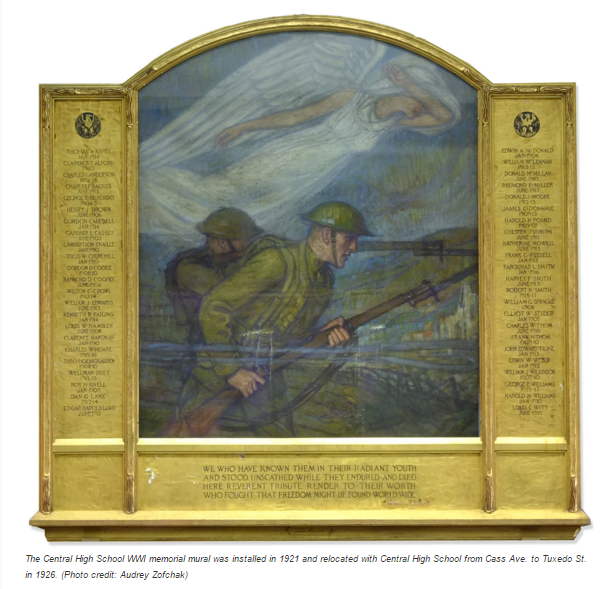
The Central High School WWI memorial mural

== See also ==
- Wayne State University Art Collection
- Smithsonian Archive of American Art Oral History
- Scarab Club Beam Signatures
- The City of Detroit, Michigan, 1701–1922, Volume 4. Edited by Clarence Monroe Burton, William Stocking; S.J. Clarke Publishing, 1922.
