= Fertility idol =

Fertility idol may refer to:

- A physical object associated with fertility and religion or fertility in art
- Golden Idol, a prop from the film Raiders of the Lost Ark
