= Henry Ford Hospital (painting) =

1932 artwork by Frida Kahlo

- The Lost Desire, The Flying Bed
- Artist: Frida Kahlo
- Year: 1932
- Medium: Oil on metal
- Dimensions: 30.5 cm × 38 cm (12.0 in × 15 in)
- Location: Dolores Olmedo Museum, Xochimilco, Mexico City

Henry Ford Hospital is a 1932 oil-on-metal painting by the Mexican artist Frida Kahlo about her experience of delivering a dead male fetus on 4 July at Henry Ford Hospital in Detroit, Michigan, United States, when she was approximately 3 1/2 months pregnant. Depictions of childbirth, abortion, or miscarriage are rare in the canon of Western painting, and Kahlo is "one of the only major artists to directly communicate her reproductive grief through visual art." The "bloody and terrifying" painting opened a defining and influential era of Kahlo's career. The painting's first title was The Lost Desire. An alternate title is The Flying Bed (La Cama Volando).

== Pregnancy and loss ==
Frida Kahlo had a complicated obstetric/gynecological medical history. She survived a catastrophic traffic accident in which her pelvis had been broken and her vagina had been pierced by a metal bar. She likely had uterine scarring. She also had post-polio symptoms; her father had epilepsy, which she was apparently concerned would be a genetic trait passed on to her children; she was plagued with chronic back pain and assorted infections; and by all accounts she desperately wanted to have a baby fathered by her husband, the muralist Diego Rivera.

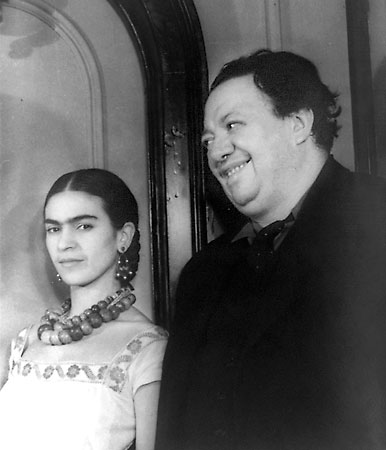
Frida Kahlo and Diego Rivera ~ 1932

Kahlo was 24 years old at the time of her summer 1932 pregnancy. Per Kahlo's biographer Hayden Herrera, on 26 May she wrote her friend and advisor Dr. Leo Eloesser that she was two months pregnant and had first gone to see Dr. Pratt at Henry Ford Hospital approximately a week prior. In the letter she itemized her doubts about her ability to deliver a healthy child, challenges with her schedule, her lack of family support, and Rivera's inability to parent. (Kahlo considered Rivera to be an infant of sorts, and painted him as such on at least one occasion.) Dr. Pratt gave Kahlo castor oil (a purgative known to induce uterine contractions) and quinine, which together was a formula for inducing miscarriage, i.e., a medical abortion. After approximately six days of mild spotting, she returned to Dr. Pratt. He told her she was still pregnant, that he thought she could and should stay pregnant, and that a Caesarean delivery was possible and would solve the problems that she foresaw with her pregnancy. Kahlo had written Dr. Eloesser about her ambivalence, seeking his direction about whether or not to pursue a surgical abortion (presumably dilation and curettage or dilation and evacuation). But after she sent the first letter, per Herrera, "Frida had decided against [a surgical] abortion, hoping against hope that Dr. Pratt was right."

The artist Lucienne Bloch, who was living with Rivera and Kahlo in Detroit, reported that by the end of June, Kahlo was spotting (early pregnancy bleeding), cramping, and nauseated, but also refusing to return to Dr. Pratt. By the night of 4 July, Kahlo was in severe pain and bleeding heavily. Rivera called for an ambulance on the morning of 5 July. In her diary, Bloch described Kahlo as being taken away by the doctor in "the agonies of birth...out of the pool of blood she had made...the huge clots of blood she kept losing."

Per another letter from Kahlo to Eloesser, the fetus "did not take form since it came out all disintegrated." This language suggests a non-viable pregnancy and subsequent decomposition. Kahlo remained in the hospital until 17 July. Whether the experience depicted in both Henry Ford Hospital and a related untitled lithograph should be characterized as an abortion or a miscarriage remains a topic of contention in art scholarship.

== Picture ==
In this surrealist self-portrait the artist lies in a floating hospital bed surrounded by blood and totems representing her experience and emotions. Foremost amongst these symbols is the fetus itself, centered and central. While she was still in the hospital, Kahlo asked for medical illustrations that described her fetus and the human biology of pregnancy loss, but the doctors refused her request. Instead, Diego Rivera got her human anatomy textbooks. Obstetricians have described Kahlo's depictions of female anatomy and reproductive experiences as "strikingly accurate and incredibly detailed."

In the painting, Kahlo depicts herself naked, breasts and pubic hair exposed, openly weeping. She is tethered by red threads to a teaching model of female reproductive anatomy, a snail ("a private allusive reference"), a piece of steel-gray medical equipment (possibly an autoclave), a purple orchid, and a human pelvis bone. The tether to the fetus lacks a bow and may be an umbilical cord, an image that appears elsewhere in Kahlo's oeuvre. The fetus has male genitalia and translucent eyelids, and appears to be about 33 weeks gestation. The orchid, a lavender cattleya, was a gift from Diego Rivera. This painting is the only image of an orchid in her artwork.

A horizon line cuts through the background of the painting, in the distance is Ford's River Rouge complex. Diego Rivera and Frida Kahlo had come to Detroit because Edsel Ford had commissioned the Detroit Industry murals for the Detroit Institute of Arts.

Henry Ford Hospital is one of several Kahlo artworks that include simultaneously medically accurate and surrealist images of reproduction; her painting My Birth (1932) is another major example.

== Influence ==
The field of medical humanities has found value in examining Henry Ford Hospital and Kahlo's other obstetric artworks. Kahlo's perspective on motherhood and femininity has also been examined in light of this painting.

== See also ==
- Perinatal bereavement
- Miscarriage and grief
- List of paintings by Frida Kahlo
- Pregnancy in art
