= Infertility and childlessness stigmas =

Form of social judgment

Infertility and childlessness stigmas are social and cultural codes that identify the inability to have children as a disgraceful state of being. Broadly speaking, in many cultures, "Demonstrating fertility is necessary to be considered a full adult, a real man or woman, and to leave a legacy after death," and thus the failure to make this demonstration is penalized. Both male infertility and female infertility can be stigmatized, however, in many traditional cultures, women are held responsible for child-rearing and thus for pregnancy or the lack thereof. Infertility and childlessness stigmas are related to disability or physical-deformity stigmas and violation-of-group-norm stigmas. Infertility is a "deeply intimate matter, often deemed as taboo to discuss publicly."

Infertility and childlessness can have negative social, psychological and economic consequences, including "discrimination, social exclusion, and abandonment." Adults without children may be subject to derisive language, intrusive questioning, shaming, ostracism, and physical abuse. Other negative consequences of the infertility–childlessness stigma, especially for women, may include depression, low self-esteem, and even suicidal ideation or suicide. People with infertility living in societies where it is a stigmatized condition may suffer from anxiety, may choose to self-isolate, and may become secretive or withdrawn. In pro-natalist societies, voluntary childlessness is often considered a deviant behavior.

Stigmas may be particularly acute in communities that organize themselves collectively and thus place a high value on clan, lineage and perpetuation of family legacy. In these cultures, childlessness may be viewed as a "tragedy for the whole community" beyond the personal significance for infertile or childless individuals. However, even in a prototypically individualistically organized society, 42 percent of women tested in a study of the emotional consequences of infertility were found to have "global distress levels in the clinically significant range," in part due to social norms that judge women without children to be "unnatural and selfish."

Most academic study of infertility addresses expensive treatment technologies, rather than the "anthropological and public health" effects. In more-developed countries, the widespread availability of assisted reproductive technologies has "transformed infertility from an acute, private agony that was accepted as fate, into a chronic, public stigma from which there were costly, and often unfulfilled hopes, of deliverance." In some cultures, biomedical explanations for infertility may be disregarded in favor of traditional beliefs that past wrong choices have resulted in the placement of an infertility curse, thus accelerating the vicious cycle of stigma. Blame may assigned, variously, to having offended gods or ancestors, abortions in a past life, practicing witchcraft, past promiscuity, use of birth control, wrong living generally, etc. Exclusion of the infertile or childlessness from social events is known, enacted as a means of quarantine to prevent the "contagion" or "toxin" of non-reproduction from spreading within the community. Infertile people are also viewed as sad people who may bring sadness with them and "spoil" celebrations.

As one scholar put it, "Like leprosy and epilepsy, infertility bears an ancient social stigma. An archaic term for the condition of female infertility, present in the Old Testament, is barren woman. There have been three traditional means of addressing infertility:

1. Medical interventions or quasi-medical treatments; the ancient Greeks called childless women ateknos, and possible causes and treatments for infertility were considered in Hippocratic texts.
2. Spiritual recourse (prayer for fecundity, or alternately, submission to the will of a deity or power)
3. Realignment of social relationships, including divorce, polygamy, adultery, or promiscuity. One study showed that infertility in Ghana led to "increased risk of precarious sexual behaviour of both men and women...trying out different partners, attempting to prove that they are not the source of the infecundity." In traditional Chinese family structure (called the Dishu system in English), "The first of the seven conditions under which a wife may be repudiated is infecundity."

In some societies, women with children are allowed access to certain community resources and privileges from which childless women may be excluded, thus children act as a sort of universal passport to humanity.

In some cultures, funeral practices for childless women are different from those for women who successfully conceived and bore offspring. Notably, "In the Hindu religion, a woman without a child, particularly a son, can't go to heaven. Sons perform death rituals." In Catholicism, there is a limbo of infants for stillborn babies (as baptism is a sacrament available only to the living), thus women unable to bring a pregnancy to term would be told they would not encounter their children's souls in an afterlife. The original doctrine was that these fetuses or babies were consigned to hell, resulting in a latter-day practice called respite sanctuaries. In the traditional Vietnamese belief system, childlessness risks destroying "the entire âm realm of one's ancestors and consequently scatters all ancestral linh hon into wandering ghosts and demons (ma qüy)."

An individual's ability to deflect or resist stigma may depend on array of intersecting age, gender, class, economic, and/or psychological factors.

A study of infertility experiences in Zambia concluded:

Stigma cannot be broken in silence. Healthcare policies and education should increase discussion of infertility without shaming infertile people. Men may have more power in their communities; their experiences must be included.

== See also ==
- Reproductive privilege
- Reproductive loss
- Son preference
- Third-party reproduction
- Stratified reproduction
- Shunning
- Ableism
- Incel
- Status symbol
- Cultural variations in adoption
- Human reproductive ecology
- Fertility and religion
- Fertility rite
- Fertility in art
