= Reproductive privilege =

Form of social privilege

Reproductive privilege is a form of social privilege that describes people who have been able to regenerate themselves biologically and produce new generations with an unremarkable level of difficulty. People with a reproductive disadvantage (including those with infertility, recurrent miscarriages, involuntary childlessness, or other forms of reproductive loss or lack) use the term in reference to the variant levels of ease or difficulty with which people can become/stay pregnant and carry to term (if female) or father a living child (if male). The concept of reproductive difference is controversial and discussion of reproductive privilege is fraught with the social and sociological conflicts that are common to public discourse about children and families.

The concept of reproductive privilege, like the related concept of ableism, identifies a human capacity that many take for granted but that is not universally accessible. Reproduction is limited to people with certain bodies, at certain times of their lives, usually with certain baseline levels of physical and mental health. In addition, reproductive behaviors have traditionally occurred within a certain social and economic framework that may be inaccessible to some people for any number of reasons. A stereotypical post-menopausal 19th century spinster who still yearns for children might see a young and beautiful bride as having "reproductive privilege" in that she has an opportunity for and strong likelihood of reproduction. Heterosexual couples have a reproductive advantage over homosexual couples. An infertile couple that successfully adopted arguably has two forms of reproductive privilege, one compared to the biological parents who were not financially or emotionally equipped to raise an infant to adulthood, and two, to other adoption-seeking parents who have not been able to successfully arrange an adoption. While the most common use of reproductive privilege is in regards to fertility versus infertility, it can also describe the comfort of a privileged ignorance of miscarriage, stillbirth and infant death. In the words of one writer, "If people talking about their grief, their loss, their lack makes you feel uncomfortable and defensive: well, that’s privilege...You're entitled to your happiness. Just as we are entitled not to censor our sadness."

Opponents of the concept argue that it commodifies children.

== See also ==
- Stratified reproduction
- Infertility and childlessness stigmas
