= Qinhuai lantern =

Chinese traditional art

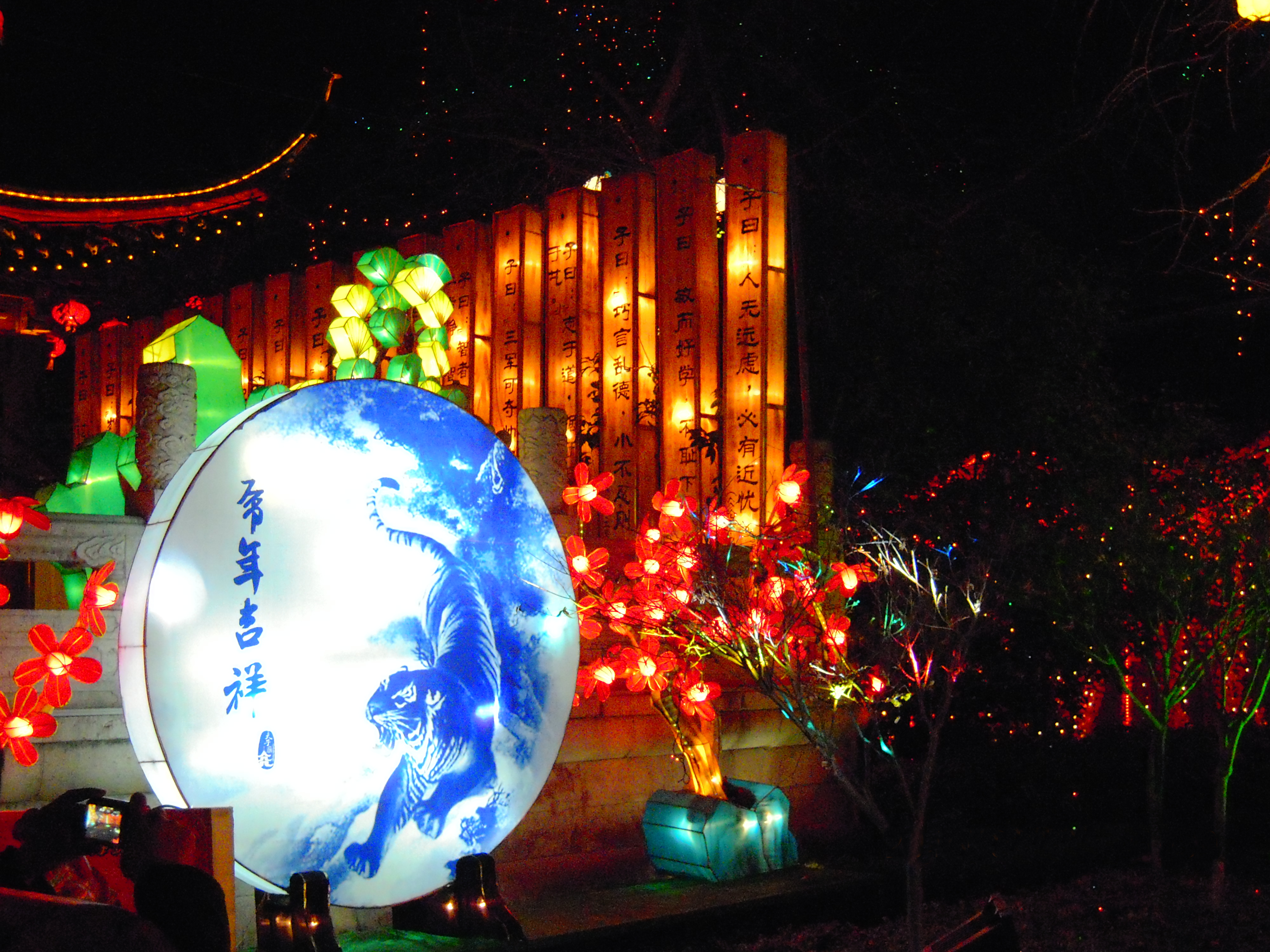
Lanterns in Confucius Temple, Nanjing, 2010

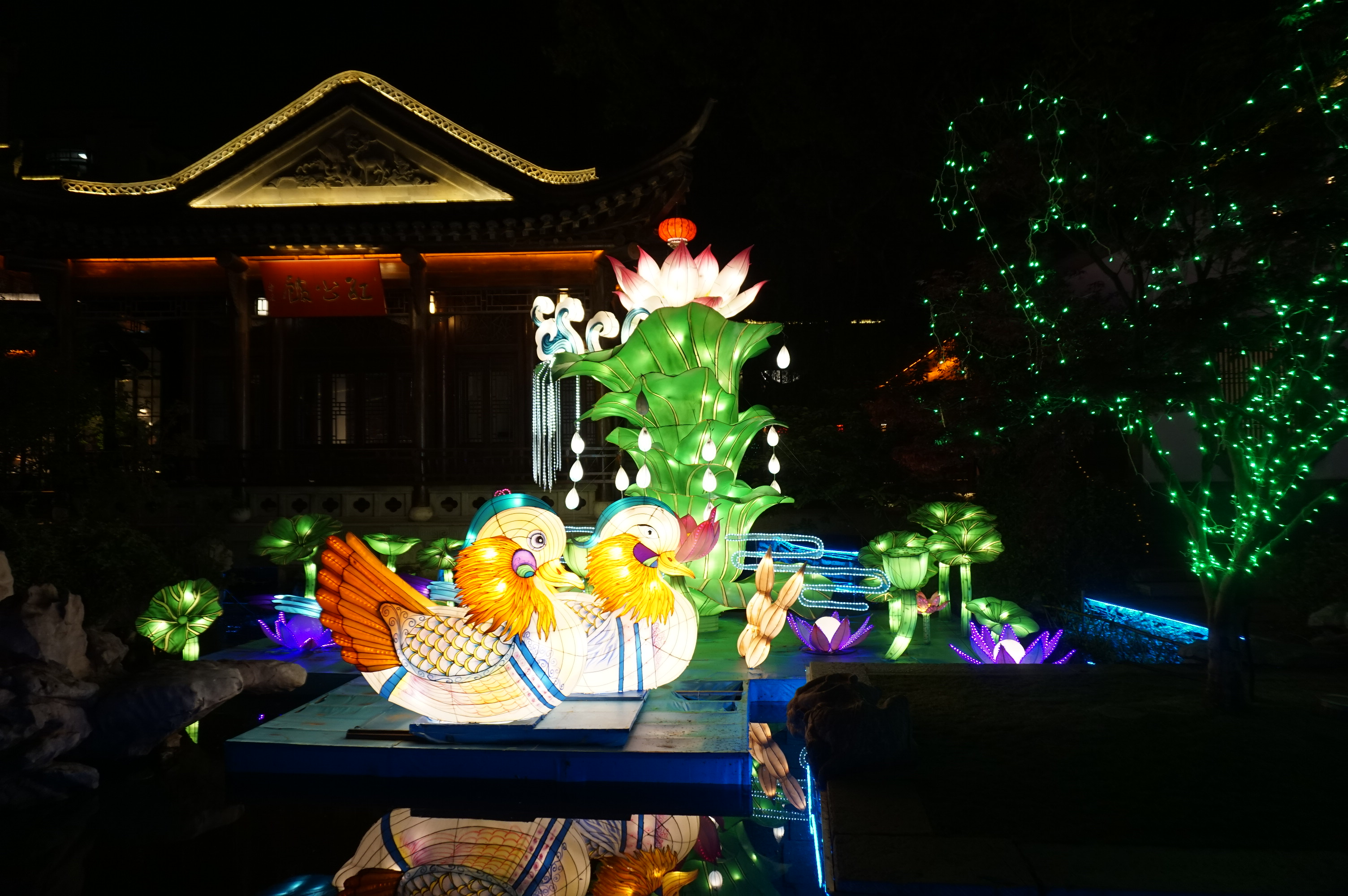
Nanjing Lantern Art, Nanjing, 2019

Qinhuai lantern is the traditional art of Jurong City, Jiangsu Province, in China, and part of the national intangible cultural heritage of China. Qinhuai lantern, also known as "Jinling lantern" and "Nanjing lantern", is one of the representative folk arts in Nanjing. The origin of Qinhuai lantern colour can be traced back to the Eastern Wu period, it draws on the traditional Chinese paper tie, painting, calligraphy, paper cutting, shadow puppetry, embroidery, sculpture and other arts, in the production of integrated carpentry, lacquer, painting, carving, clay sculpture, knotting and many other technical means. Qinhuai has a variety of lanterns, reaching from the traditional lanterns to lotus lanterns and lion lanterns. The variety and design of lantern works represents also current events to the time of design, such as ocean-going ships, carrier rockets, urban construction, mountain and forest landscapes.

On June 7, 2008, the lantern (Qinhuai lantern) was approved by the State Council of the People's Republic of China to be included in the second batch of national intangible cultural heritage list, heritage number: VII.-50.

== Historical development ==
=== Beginnings ===
The first Chinese paper lanterns were introduced in the Eastern Han Dynasty and were used as lamps and for the worship of Buddha. They were also use as symbols of status, fertility, and prosperity. Eventually, the use of the lanterns became more decorative and were used by the common folks during festivals. Images of natural elements and mythical creatures would be used as the basis of the designs of the lanterns.

The origin of Qinhuai lanterns can be traced back to the Eastern Wu period, every Lantern festival and other festive festivals, in addition to the Eastern Wu Taichu Palace, Zhaoming Palace, Eastern Jin Dynasty Jiankang Palace in the lanterns, some of the dignitaries living on the banks of the Qinhuai River also in their own mansion portals. The Ming Dynasty was the period when Qinhuai lanterns were developed the most. In order to create a prosperous picture, Zhu Yuanzhang vigorously advocated the Lantern Festival. He extended the time of the lantern festival to ten nights, and in the fifth year of Ming Hongwu (1372) Lantern Festival, he also ordered the firing of ten thousand water lanterns on the Qinhuai River. During this period, the dragon dance lanterns and lion lanterns also began to appear. Three years later, he ordered that outside the noon gate of the Nanjing Imperial Palace, skilled craftsmen should tie up the "Long Live" lamp on Aoshan Mountain, accompanied by song and dance. After the middle of the Ming Dynasty, Nanjing's economy developed rapidly, and drum music and hanging lanterns had been added to the painting boats of the Qinhuai River, which was commonly known as "lamp boats". At this point, the development of Qinhuai lanterns has reached a climax period.

=== Rise and decline ===
In the late Ming Dynasty, the production technology of Qinhuai lanterns became more than exquisite, and there were also great developments in varieties and styles, including tiger lamps, toad lamps, fish lamps, shrimp lamps, crab lamps, lotus lamps, diamond lamps, lotus lamps and more than 200 kinds. After the Taiping Heavenly Kingdom Movement, the lantern custom in Nanjing became more and more deserted, showing a situation of decline. In the third year of Tongzhi (1864), Zeng Guofan wanted to restore the Qinhuai Lantern Boat Painting Ship. He dredged the Qinhuai River, he led the rebuiduilding in the Confucius Temple, and the traditional custom of Lantern Viewing was restored and developed. At the end of the Qing Dynasty and the beginning of the Republic of China, due to internal and external troubles, the people did not have a good life, and the development of lantern art declined. In 1937, the Japanese invading army attacked Nanjing, and some lantern artists were also displaced and relocated. In the three or four years after the victory of the Anti-Japanese War in 1945, the people's livelihood in Nanjing was withering, inflation was serious, and the lights of Qinhuai also declined.

=== Revival stage ===
In 1949, while developing the economy, the local government in Nanjing also attached importance to the development of traditional illumination art. In the Confucius Temple and along the Qinhuai River, colourful lanterns made by lantern artists can be seen everywhere, as well as colourful floats that reflect the characteristics of the times. During the Cultural Revolution, many folk arts, including lanterns, were classified as the "four olds", and traditional cultural things were rarely asked. In the Spring Festival of 1977, the Nanjing Confucius Temple Lamp Market was restored, and the once-silent traditional lantern customs were restored and developed. After 1984, the local government in Nanjing began to organize the Jinling Lantern Festival during the Spring Festival and Lantern Festival, and Qinhuai lanterns have since entered a new stage of development.

== Characteristics ==
=== Style ===
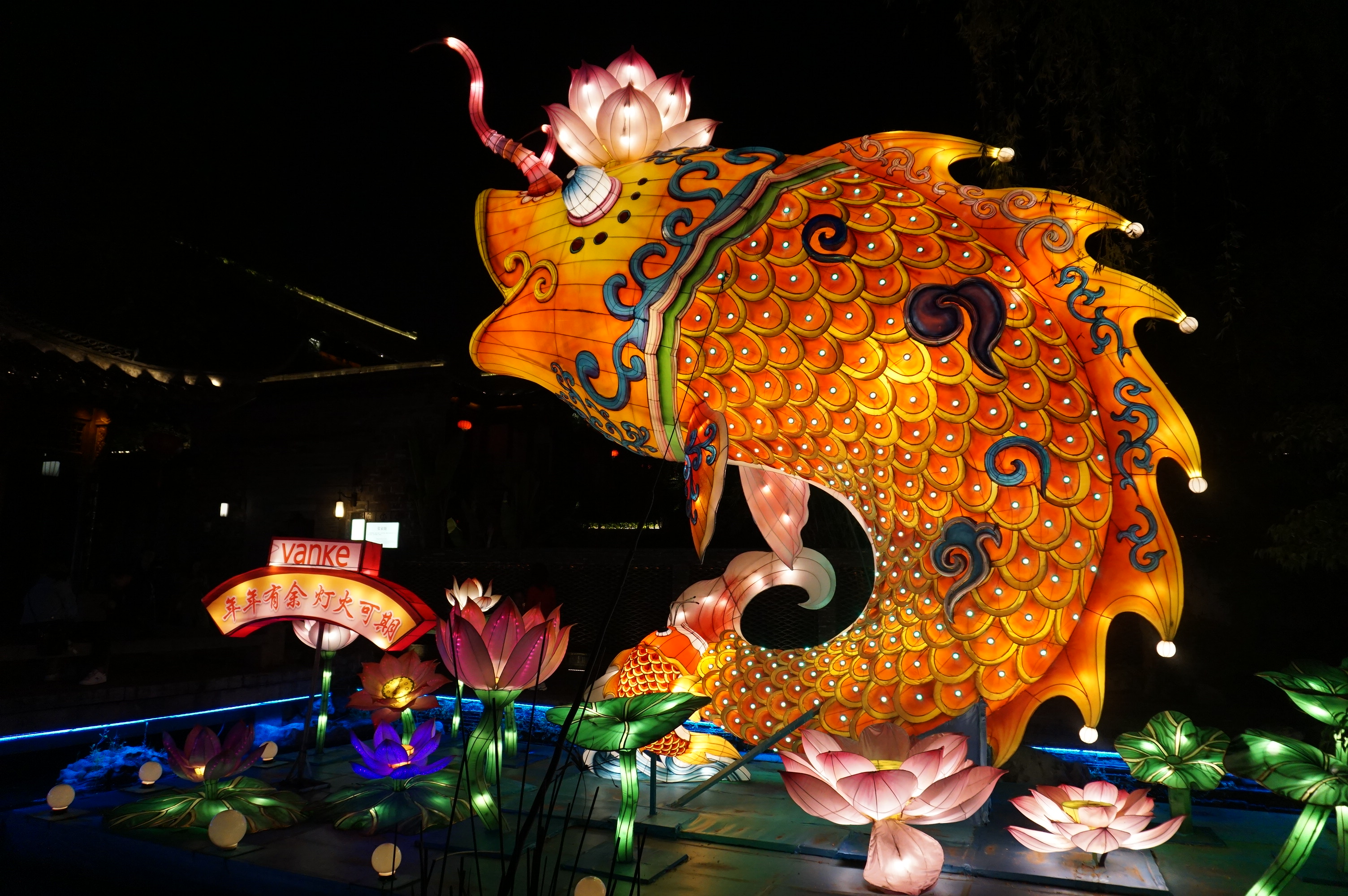
Fish-Shaped Lantern Art, Nanjing, 2019

Most of the shapes of Qinhuai lanterns are taken from nature, with a certain degree of bionicity, and then through the subjective exaggeration and deformation of craftsmen, the lanterns add a national atmosphere on the basis of exquisite portraits.

There are many styles of Qinhuai lanterns, traditional flower lamps include yarn lamps, sheepskin lamps, filament lamps, three-star lamps, eight immortal lamps, cornucopia lamps, leather ball lamps, watermelon lamps, grass worm lamps, goldfish lamps and wall lamps with various character shapes. The structural shape of the flower lamp can be either large or small, but no matter the size, it can vividly show the beauty of the lamp. In addition, the lantern artists also continue to innovate, trying to use light guidance, voice control, and electronic technology to produce a variety of new lanterns, such as pig eight commandment lamp, panda lamp, peacock lamp, zodiac lamp, constellation lamp, folding three-dimensional lotus lamp, and plastic film colour ball lamp.

=== Colour ===
Artists pay attention to the reproduction of traditional tastes, mostly using warm colours with strong and bright colours such as red, yellow, gold, and orange, or appropriately matched with silver, white and green tones, but rarely use dark or black as the main colour. Because warm and bright colours are a symbol of auspiciousness, happiness and social harmony, and the simple colours are like icing on the cake, giving people a sense of elegance. For example, the lotus flower was originally pink, but the lantern artists sometimes made the petals into the red or golden lotus lamps, so that it was full of festiveness and rich auspicious atmosphere, creating a warm and celebratory New Year atmosphere.

== Production process ==
=== Materials ===
Qinhuai lantern production materials are mainly bamboo, trees, rattan, wheat straw, animal horns, metals, etc. The materials that constitute the light source are determined according to the level of development of productive forces in different historical periods, from the beginning of the Six Dynasties to the modern era, mainly using pine resin, animal and vegetable oil, lacquer, paraffin, kerosene and other fuels, with bamboo, grass, cotton core, etc. as the wick, and later electric light source were used. Its surface translucent materials include various colors of translucent paper, silk veil, painting yarn, cotton, synthetic satin, plastic film and special glass, etc., and some also add beautification patterns and carvings according to the needs of the performance object.

=== Production ===
The production of Qinhuai lantern colour can be completed by dozens of processes such as splitting, sawing, cutting, cutting, smoking, baking, ironing, dipping, dyeing, tying, mounting, writing and drawing, painting, carving, and assembly. The process also includes several basic links such as material selection and processing, skeleton tie, outer paste mounting, lamp configuration, and overall beautification. In the application of artistic means, Qinhuai Lantern Color draws on the traditional Chinese artistic experience and related techniques such as paper tying, painting, calligraphy, paper-cutting, shadow puppet embroidery, sculpture; and integrates the process skills of carpentry, lacquer work, painting, carving, clay sculpture, knotting, mounting paste, welding, mechanical transmission, sound and light sound, electronic program control and so on.

== Social Influence ==
- A light installation is displayed during the Moonlight Forest Magical Lantern Art Festival at the Los Angeles County Arboretum and Botanic Garden, Nov. 9, 2019. Moonlight Forest features displays of larger-than-life lantern art handcrafted by artisans from China. The lanterns illuminate the garden and provide delightful photo ops.
