= Clyde Huntley Burroughs =

American museum administrator

Clyde Huntley Burroughs (February 17, 1882 – October 5, 1973) was a museum director from Vassar, Michigan.

== Biography ==
He began work at the Detroit Museum of Art (predecessor to the Detroit Institute of Arts) in 1901 as assistant to museum director Armand H. Griffith and was officially conferred in 1904. Clyde Burroughs became acting director of the museum in 1913 and then assistant director to Charles Moore (city planner) from 1914 to 1917. He was director in his own right between 1917 and 1924. In 1924, Wilhelm Valentiner became director and Clyde Burroughs stayed at the museum as secretary and curator of American Art. He was also a charter member of the Scarab Club. He was chairman of the district committee for public works from 1933 to 1934, helping to find work for artists during the depression. He stayed on at the Detroit Institute of Arts as secretary until his retirement in 1946.

Eventually, he and his wife Edith settled in San Diego, California.

He died in San Diego, California in 1973 at the age of 91.

== Selected works ==
Burroughs as author or co-author:

- A Guide to the Collections of the Detroit Institute of Arts of the City of Detroit. 1927. (with Wilhelm Valentiner)
- Catalogue of Paintings in the Permanent Collection of the Detroit Institute of Arts of the City of Detroit. 1930. (with Wiliam Heil)
- Burroughs, Clyde H. (1910). "An Unusual Collection of Pictures by M. J. Iwill". Fine Arts Journal. 23 (6): 329–337. JSTOR 23916200.
- Burroughs, Clyde H. (1927). "The New Home of the Detroit Institute of Arts". The American Magazine of Art. 18 (10): 544–554. JSTOR 23930344.
- Burroughs, Clyde H. (1929). "Portraits by John Neagle and Samuel F.B. Morse". Bulletin of the Detroit Institute of Arts of the City of Detroit. 10 (8): 104–06. doi:10.1086/BULLDETINST41501326. JSTOR 41501326. S2CID 192784567.

== See also ==
- Detroit Institute of Arts
- Scarab Club
- Wilhelm Reinhold Valentiner
- Charles Moore (city planner)
