= Up opening sequence =

2009 animated film sequence

The opening sequence to the 2009 Disney-Pixar film Up (sometimes referred to as "Married Life" after the accompanying instrumental piece, the Up montage, or including the rest of the prologue The First 10 Minutes of Up) has become known as a cultural milestone and a key element to the film's success.

== Background ==
While the core concept of the film was to have a house float into the sky with balloons, the filmmakers needed a rationale for why a character would do such a thing. Their solution was to show the entirety of a married couple's relationship from the first day they met to the day the wife died. They envisioned it as a wordless montage that would play like a series of Polaroid home movies. Director Pete Docter always felt that an expository sequence to open the film was important because if the viewers do not love the characters, "then [they're] not along for the ride." In an early draft of the Ellie–Carl meeting, Carl is trying to capture a bird with a trap and Ellie punches him in the face, yelling about animal rights. This led into a montage sequence of a "lifelong sneak-attack punching game, lending the script some heart in a 'non-sappy' way", according to the Huffington Post. Co-director Bob Peterson said "we thought that was the funniest thing", noting that even when Carl visited Ellie's sickbed, she gives him a feeble slap. Nevertheless, the test audiences did not warm to the sequence. Docter explained "We showed it, and there was silence. I guess they thought it was too violent or something". From that point on, the filmmakers went with a sorrowful version of the sequence.

In one cutting room session, one part of the sequence in which Ellie is despondent having learned she is not able to have children, received many notes from members of the studio, believing the moment may have pushed things too far. As a result, the scene was cut, though later put back into the film. Docter explained: "You didn't feel as deeply [without the scene] — not only just [within] that sequence, but through the whole film. Most of the emotional stuff is not just to push on people and make them cry, but it's for some greater reason to really make you care about the story."

The "Married Life" piece was the first assignment that composer Michael Giacchino had on the film. He explained: "We knew that was going to be one of the most difficult scenes in the film, so we tackled that first, and I was just working really hard to make that scene really work because I knew that was going to inform the rest of the story". Originally he had written a different piece to be played in that part of the film, but Docter requested a song that would play as if from one's grandmother's music box. Giacchino subsequently conceived of the new composition. After recording the initial piece, they went back to make touch-ups at various points to match the emotional tone of the visual sequence.

== Plot ==
The scene "sketches out Carl's early married life with childhood sweetheart Ellie". In general definitions, the 'sequence' excludes the earlier parts of the film's prologue in which Carl watches a filmreel about Charles Muntz and has a dialogue sequence with Ellie. The sequence is "only minutes in length and almost completely silent".

The sequence begins with a flash of a camera at their wedding day, followed by their first on-screen kiss, which is applauded by Ellie's lively family as well as Carl's nonchalant family. After fixing up the old house where they met to match Ellie's childhood drawing, they spend their marriage doing three main activities: watching clouds, working at a local zoo (Ellie as a tour guide and Carl as a balloon salesman), and reading together. During one cloud-watching session, Carl points out a cloud that looks like a baby. Inspired, they decide to conceive a child of their own and prepare a nursery, but as the music slows, the two learn at the doctor's office that their attempts to do so have backfired (with it being implied that Ellie either had a miscarriage or is infertile), leaving them devastated. At their house, Carl brings Ellie her childhood scrapbook, which consoles her. They begin to keep a spare change jar to save up for Ellie's dream trip to Paradise Falls. However, several events, including a flat tire, Carl breaking his leg, and the house getting damaged during a storm, cause them to repeatedly break open their jar early.

A montage of Ellie tying Carl's ties through the years follows, showing them getting ready for each day of work at the zoo; the last one she ties is a bow tie, which Carl wears for the rest of the film (it's implied that he doesn't know how to tie a tie). It is followed by them slow dancing at home, now in their old ages, the spare change jar having been shelved and forgotten. As they fix up their house, where they will spend their retirement, Carl looks upon Ellie's art of her dream trip and realizes he has yet to fulfill his promise, almost stopping the music entirely. He gets an idea and goes to a travel agency to buy tickets for Paradise Falls and takes Ellie cloud watching, bringing the tickets with him on a picnic to surprise her. However, Ellie struggles to reach Carl and collapses as her husband runs to her side.

As instruments drop out of the harmony, leaving only a piano, Carl brings a dying Ellie a balloon to the hospital just like she did with him the night he made the promise as a child. Ellie pushes her scrapbook to him, and he kisses her on the head. In the church where they married, Carl, heartbroken, is still holding the balloon, seated on the steps up to where Ellie's casket was during her funeral procession. As he climbs up the steps, they become the steps to his home. He sadly disappears through the door and pulls the balloon in after him. The screen fades to black as the music ends.

== Analysis ==
The sequence uses "visual techniques and musical sound to accomplish all the above functions without relying on dialogue". According to the filmmakers, it was intended to come across as a memory. For the paper Creating an emotional impact without dialogue: the case study of Pixar's Up, Michaela Wozny created a mood chart of the sequence. Carl is seen as sympathetic throughout the rest of the film "due to [his] helplessness against the often-cruel, vindictive power of fate."

The musical themes established during this sequence play throughout the rest of the film, changing in timbre depending on the context, as an emotional anchor to the relationship of Ellie and Carl.

== Critical reception and legacy ==
=== Visual sequence ===
Roger Ebert praised the sequence in the film calling it "poetic and touching" and stating that it "deals with the life experience in a way that is almost never found in family animation". The Guardian described the sequence as "remarkable", "brilliant", and a "masterclass in narrative exposition" and thought the childlessness reveal would be emotionally affecting to the audience. The Daily Telegraph described it as "one of the most extraordinary openings to a film", live-action or otherwise, noting that in the context of a larger film, it "dares to risk alienating" the audience animated films are generally targeted towards, and threatens to topload the drama thereby making the rest of the film a letdown.

The Washington Post deemed it "touching". CinemaBlend described it as a "heart-wrenching rollercoaster of emotions" and a "bonanza of bittersweetness". The Los Angeles Times writes that it "details the highs and lows of two lives with poignancy and depth." The Guardian deemed Ellie's death to be a "heart-wrenchingly understated" scene.

Scott Meslow of GQ felt the montage had "sheer emotional power" and in 2018 wrote it still "fucks [him] up". Uproxx deemed it "beautifully depressing" and "as good as Pixar gets". Rotoscopers felt the sequence "shatters the stereotype of animation being strictly for children". Sean Wilson of Den of Geek wrote the sequence left him a "weeping husk of a man".

=== Music ===
The Hollywood News felt the "Married Life" composition enveloped and evolved the scene.

=== Awards and nominations ===
Michael Giacchino won the Academy Award for Best Original Score at the 82nd ceremony, and the Grammy Award for Best Instrumental Composition for the "Married Life" portion of the score at the 2010 ceremony.

=== Parodies ===
The opening scene for Up has inspired numerous parodies, including the It's Always Sunny in Philadelphia episode "The Gang Saves the Day", The Amazing World of Gumball episodes "The Love" and "The Choices", and an Itchy & Scratchy Show skit entitled "P.U."

== See also ==
- Reproductive loss
