= Perinatal bereavement =

Human emotional/psychological response

Perinatal bereavement or perinatal grief refers to the emotions of the family following a perinatal death, defined as the demise of a fetus (during pregnancy) or newborn infant (up to 30 days after birth). Perinatal loss affects one in every ten women across the globe with the worldwide perinatal death rate at approximately 2.7 million deaths per year. Perinatal death is recognized as a traumatic life event as it is often sudden, unexpected, and devastating to parents who have had little to no direct life experiences with their child before their death.

Perinatal bereavement, while sharing similarities with grief for other loved ones, is unique due to its nature as the loss of an idealized future relationship. Parents often experience grief over the loss of their sense of self and role, which can complicate the grieving process. This type of grief may lead to prolonged or severe symptoms, including complicated grief or psychiatric illnesses like depression, making it critical to differentiate between normal and complicated grief.

== Types of perinatal loss ==
=== Miscarriage ===
A miscarriage, or spontaneous abortion, is defined as a "natural pregnancy loss before 20 weeks of gestation." According to The American College of Obstetricians and Gynecologists (ACOG), miscarriage is the most frequent type of pregnancy loss. Approximately 15% of all pregnancies result in a miscarriage, with one in every four women experiencing a miscarriage at some point in their life. 50% of all miscarriages result from chromosomal abnormalities, while the remaining cases could be a mixture of physical, hormonal, environmental, and lifestyle factors. Risk factors for miscarriage include advanced maternal age, history of previous miscarriages, obesity, autoimmune disorders, substance use, and more. Despite recommendations of bed rest, administrations of hormones such as β-hCG and prophylactic progesterone, uterine relaxants, and other therapies, there are no effective means of preventing a miscarriage.

Common symptoms of miscarriage include vaginal bleeding and lower abdominal cramping. However, these symptoms are not definitive of a miscarriage occurring. To distinguish a miscarriage from other pregnancy complications, a thorough evaluation of a patient's medical history, as well as a physical examination, transvaginal ultrasound, and blood tests are recommended.

=== Stillbirth ===
Pregnancy loss that occurs after 20 weeks of gestation is referred to as a stillbirth. Stillbirth involves the delivery of a fetus that has passed away before or during birth. Almost 1.9 million stillbirths occur each year, with unexplained stillbirths accounting for 76% of cases across the globe. Risk factors for stillbirth include placental abnormalities, advanced maternal age, diabetes, substance use, hypertension, previous stillbirths, and more. However, it is often difficult to assess the cause of stillbirth if systematic investigations into the cause of death are not undertaken.

=== Neonatal mortality ===
Neonatal mortality refers to the death of an infant within the first 28 days after birth. 75% of all neonatal deaths occur during the first seven days of life (also referred to as early neonatal mortality), with the main causes of neonatal death being preterm birth, congenital malformations, perinatal asphyxia or trauma, neonatal infections, and other birth disorders. Approximately 2.4 million neonatal deaths occur each year, with the majority of deaths taking place in low- and middle-income countries. In 2020, almost half of all deaths in children under the age of five occurred during the newborn period.

== History ==
Women have documented their experiences of perinatal bereavement since at least the 19th century. However, modern research into the effects of this type of loss began in the 1960s, led by a small number of psychoanalysts. One of the first to recognize miscarriage as a traumatic event was psychoanalyst A.C. Cain in 1964. Cain explored the impact of child loss on siblings and described the profound emotions women often face after a miscarriage, including fear, grief, anger, and despair. In 1970, Kennell, Slyter, and Klaus conducted seminal research on the mourning response of parents to the death of a newborn infant, providing the first empirical evidence that women experience a profound mourning process following such a loss.

Before the 1970s, the medical community often dismissed perinatal loss classifying it as insignificant, resulting in little recognition of perinatal bereavement. Over time, three key factors contributed to the acknowledgment of perinatal bereavement as a legitimate experience:

- Emergence of Attachment Theory: Research on maternal bonding during pregnancy, highlighting the deep emotional connections formed between mothers and their unborn babies.
- Shifting Social Perspectives: Changing societal attitudes allowed women to voice their grief and advocate for recognition of their suffering after perinatal loss.
- Advances in Neonatal Care: Innovations in neonatal technology, including the regionalization of neonatal intensive care

The recognition of perinatal bereavement sparked a significant increase in research and literature on the topic in the 1980s. Since then, there has been an effort to address gaps in the field by conducting more systematic studies with larger sample sizes, providing a deeper understanding of perinatal bereavement.

== Measurement ==
The most widely used measure for perinatal grief is the Perinatal Grief Scale (PGS), developed by Lori J. Toedter, Judith N. Lasker and Janice M. Alhadeff in 1988. PGS is used both by researchers to understand perinatal grief and by psychiatrists as a testing instrument to assess a patient experiencing perinatal bereavement. The PGS consists of 33 statements regarding feelings following perinatal loss and a scale of answers ranging from "strongly agree" to "strongly disagree." The 33 statements are categorized into three subscales, each consisting of 11 items:

- Active Grief: emotions such as sadness, longing for the baby, and crying;
- Difficulty Coping: behaviors like withdrawal and symptoms of depression;
- Despair: feelings of worthlessness and hopelessness.

Elevated scores within specific subsections, particularly the Difficult Coping and Despair subscales, serves as a valuable predictor of complicated grief. These insights can help healthcare providers identify individuals who may benefit from follow-up care.

Critics of the Perinatal Grief Scale (PGS) argue that it places excessive emphasis on emotions specifically related to the loss of the baby, while neglecting other grief-related feelings. Additionally, the scale has been criticized for overlapping significantly with indicators of depression. Despite the development of other perinatal grief instruments, the PGS remains the most consistent and reliable means of assessing perinatal grief for clinicians and researchers. It has been instrumental in gauging grief responses in patients, assessing related psychological and social factors, and evaluating the effectiveness of bereavement interventions. The widespread use of the Perinatal Grief Scale (PGS) may be attributed to its ease of application, quick analysis, and successful validation across various languages and cultures, reinforcing its utility as both a clinical and research tool.

== Factors influencing severity ==
The Perinatal Grief Scale (PGS) has been instrumental in helping researchers identify key factors associated with perinatal grief reactions. A scoping review identified four primary factors commonly examined for their influence on grief responses: (1) sociodemographic characteristics, (2) support systems, (3) reproductive history, and (4) mental health status.

Among these factors, support consistently emerged as the strongest predictor of lower grief scores. Higher levels of marital satisfaction, social support, participation in professional support groups, and religiosity were all associated with reduced grief as measured by PGS scores.

Conversely, mental health status was the factor most consistently associated with higher grief scores. Individuals with pre-existing mental health issues were more likely to report elevated levels of grief following a perinatal loss.

The influence of other factors, including sociodemographics and reproductive history, yielded mixed or conflicting results. The lack of consensus among researchers can be attributed to variations in study designs, sample populations, and the diverse measures used to evaluate grief.

== Psychological impact ==
The loss of a child, regardless of their age, is a profoundly painful event for any parent to experience. Perinatal death is especially traumatic as it is rarely anticipated and can defy parents' expectations of the natural order of life. The grieving process involved in a sudden perinatal death further includes the loss of future dreams, experiences, and expectations associated with their child's future.

Reactions to perinatal loss can vary widely depending on one's personal, cultural, and situational factors. In a typical grieving process, the intensity of grief gradually lessens over the course of a year after the loss. In several longitudinal studies, Perinatal Grief Scale (PGS) scores, as expected, decrease over the two years following a loss among bereaved parents as a whole. However, for a majority of parents experiencing perinatal loss, varying patterns of persistent and unresolved grief remain after two years of the loss. For example, around 20% of women continue to experience clinically significant symptoms even a year after the loss.

Perinatal death can have profound emotional consequences for parents, families, and communities. For mothers, the consequences of perinatal loss can be physical (such as hemorrhage or infection) and psychological (such as symptoms of post-traumatic stress, anxiety, depression, and other serious mental health disorders). Approximately one in five women who go through perinatal loss develop depression or post-traumatic stress disorder (PTSD). Over the course of their lives, the likelihood of experiencing PTSD linked to perinatal loss is estimated at 29%. For fathers, feelings of pain, sadness, inadequacy, and helplessness may be masked to assume the responsibility of supporting their partners during the grieving process. Furthermore, as bereavement care guidelines tend to be female-focused, bereaved fathers may feel overlooked and marginalized by medical professionals, workplace policies, and community support programs, leading to unresolved grief. Complicated grief, or prolonged grief disorder (PGD), can develop following a perinatal death due to a lack of social support, poor marital relations, fertility struggles, pre-existing mental health conditions, and/or the absence of other children. A lack of acknowledgement and support from society and healthcare professionals of the emotional impact of perinatal loss can further lead to parents experiencing disenfranchised grief, which may result in secretive mourning and heightened feelings of guilt and self-blame. Maladaptive coping mechanisms, such as avoidance, emotional suppression, or self-blame for the loss, are often linked to negative outcomes.

=== Complicating factors ===
There are several complicating factors associated with perinatal loss that can hinder the normal grieving process for parents. In the case of miscarriage, others may be unaware of a mother's loss due to the typical recommendation to only announce pregnancy after the end of the first trimester (week 12). As such, mothers may feel unable to share their experience of child loss with others due to the stigma surrounding child death and the perception that they are not "real mothers." Furthermore, when child loss occurs during an early pregnancy stage, there is typically no funeral or other mourning rituals performed that may help parents feel that they have honored their child's existence. The lack of closure and recognition that arises from the inability to publicly acknowledge and mourn their child's death can exacerbate grief intensity and increase the likelihood of developing complicated grief. The lack of societal recognition or support for parents mourning a stillbirth is referred to as disenfranchised grief. Many parents feel isolated, as their identity as parents is often not acknowledged by healthcare providers, family, or society. They face the painful reality of being parents without a living child. Fathers, in particular, frequently report feeling overlooked and marginalized in their grief, with their role as grieving parents largely unrecognized. Mothers bereaved by stillbirth or miscarriage may feel that they are to blame for their child's death, or that they do not have a right to bereavement as they do not have physical memories of the child. Mothers, in particular, may experience feelings of failure, guilt, or a sense that their bodies have betrayed them. Parents have limited time with their child, leading them to grieve not only the loss itself but also the future they had envisioned.

=== Loss of identity ===
The death of a child during pregnancy or shortly after birth can have a strong effect on a mother's sense of identity. Bereaved mothers may find it difficult to connect to or accept their identity as a mother after experiencing child loss, resulting in a fragmented sense of self. Feelings of having failed to become a mother, being robbed of motherhood, and experiencing exclusion and silence from society can interfere with the construction of maternal identity. Additionally, bereaved mothers may struggle with ongoing pregnancy-related symptoms after their baby has passed, such as lactation, postpartum hormonal changes, and alterations in body shape. These physical reminders of their pregnancy and the child that was lost can intensify emotional distress, leading mothers to feel a need to distance themselves from their bodies. Bereaved mothers frequently grapple with reconciling their identity as mothers with their identity as individuals who have suffered child loss. Their sense of motherhood can feel threatened by societal reminders, such as consent forms asking how many children they have, holidays like Mother's Day, representations of families in advertisements, and displays in baby sections. Various grief responses may lead these mothers to retreat socially, avoid mentioning their deceased child, develop extreme anxiety about losing future children, and strive to create a new normal for themselves while honoring their child.

=== Relationships ===
Parental relationships are at a higher risk of dissolution following a miscarriage or stillbirth compared to relationships after a live birth. The impact of a miscarriage on a relationship typically manifests within the first two to three years, whereas the effects of a stillbirth can persist for up to a decade. Research indicates that stillbirths have a more significant impact on parental relationships than miscarriages. However, because miscarriages are more common, they collectively affect a greater number of relationships.

Parents may exhibit different grieving styles in response to loss, with research suggesting that mothers are more likely to grieve intuitively, while fathers often adopt an instrumental grieving style.

The intuitive grieving style is characterized by the expression of emotions and a focus on processing grief through verbal communication and emotional sharing. Individuals who grieve intuitively may find comfort in discussing their feelings, crying, or seeking social support as a way to cope with their loss.

In contrast, the instrumental grieving style emphasizes action-oriented coping mechanisms. This approach involves engaging in practical activities or projects, such as creating memorials, working towards specific goals, or focusing on problem-solving tasks, rather than expressing emotions openly.

While these patterns are often associated with gender differences, they are not exclusive, and many individuals display a blend of both grieving styles. Differences in grieving styles may lead to interpersonal conflict; a lack of willingness to understand each other can threaten the sense of unity in a relationship and create a feeling of isolation in one's grief. However, while pregnancy loss increases the overall risk of relationship dissolution, its effects are not universally negative. Many couples report feeling closer to their partner following the loss of a child and describe a sense of sharing a unifying bond through the shared experience. When partners demonstrate tolerance and respect for each other's expressions of grief, many parents report increased cohesion and a strengthened relationship.

Perinatal loss can significantly affect intimacy and sexual relationships. Some individuals report feelings of guilt, intrusive thoughts, or distressing mental images that hinder their ability to engage in sexual activity. Women may develop negative perceptions of their bodies, particularly due to the physical changes associated with pregnancy and childbirth, which can diminish their desire for intimacy or affect their ability to find pleasure in it. Others experience a strong urgency to conceive again, viewing sexual activity primarily as a means to achieve pregnancy. Conversely, some prefer to wait before attempting to conceive, feeling unable to face the idea of "replacing" the child they lost.

== Coping strategies ==
Coping strategies play an essential role in helping bereaved mothers manage the psychological and emotional hardships of losing a child. For some mothers, personifying their deceased child by attributing individuality, identity, and human qualities to them helps maintain a bond and grieve for a real person rather than an abstract loss. Similarly, for others, preserving the memory of their deceased child through tangible objects such as ultrasound photos, stuffed animals, and clothing can help honor their lost child and maintain their sense of motherhood.

=== Making and preserving memories ===
Parents who experience stillbirth often seek ways to preserve memories that affirm their baby's existence. Many parents value photographs taken in the hospital, though the style of the photos plays a significant role in their emotional impact. Natural or candid images are generally preferred over posed ones, as these tend to feel more authentic. Additionally, photos that resemble those taken during a live birth, avoiding overly confronting or graphic elements, are often favored. Such images are less distressing for parents to revisit and are more suitable for sharing with others. In addition to photographs, parents often cherish keepsakes that commemorate their baby. Commonly valued mementos include ink or plaster imprints of the baby's hands and feet, name cards, hospital ID bands, locks of hair, and clothing or blankets the baby wore. These tangible items provide a lasting connection and serve as meaningful reminders of their baby's presence and their status as parents. Many parents benefit from support and gentle guidance from hospital staff to engage in memory-making with their stillborn child. Factors such as insufficient information, overwhelming grief, and fear can influence parents' decisions during this time. Many later express regret for declining the opportunity to hold their child or for not spending more time with them.

== Interventions ==
Grief support groups, bereavement care programs, and individual counseling can help with emotional regulation, processing the loss, developing maternal identity, and expressing grief in a supportive environment. A meta-analysis of psychosocial interventions demonstrated their effectiveness in reducing depression, anxiety, and grief among parents coping with perinatal loss. Interventions implemented within the first six weeks after a perinatal loss had a significant positive impact, whereas interventions initiated after six weeks showed no significant effect.

=== Cognitive behavioral therapy ===
Multiple randomized controlled trials have demonstrated that cognitive behavioral therapy is highly effective in reducing chronic psychological disorders following the loss of a child. Here is an example of components included in a CBT treatment used in a study on perinatal loss:

- Psycho-education: provide information about typical responses to perinatal loss, including how emotions, thoughts, physical reactions, and behaviors are interconnected;
- Emotion regulation skill building: ask patients to plan enjoyable activities to create positive anticipation; teach mindfulness; use cognitive reappraisal techniques to help patients reframe unhelpful thoughts, particularly those centered on self-blame;
- Emotion exposure: encourage situational exposure (e.g., revisiting the hospital room or visiting the baby section of a store), imaginal exposure (e.g., visualizing moments from the pregnancy), and narrative exposure (e.g., discussing or writing about their loss);
- Review and plan for the future: review the skills acquired and develop a plan to maintain and build upon these beneficial practices in the future.

=== Swanson's care ===
Swanson's Caring Theory provides a compassionate framework for supporting women who have experienced a miscarriage. It emphasizes the importance of a therapeutic relationship between the healthcare provider and the woman to help her navigate the emotional and psychological challenges of the event. The theory outlines five key elements of the caring process:

- Maintaining Belief: Supporting patients' resilience and their ability to find personal meaning and envision meaningful futures.
- Knowing: Striving to understand the unique physical, emotional, cultural, and spiritual realities of their patients, avoiding assumptions and treating each individual as distinct.
- Being With: Offering emotional presence and genuine empathy.
- Doing For: Anticipating and performing actions to support patients physically and psychologically. Prioritizing dignity and long-term benefits over short-term efficiency.
- Enabling: Guiding and informing patients to support their physical and emotional healing while ensuring boundaries to prevent dependency.

Swanson's approach has proven to be effective for parents who experienced a miscarriage before 22 weeks, with randomized controlled trials showing significant reductions in grief symptoms.

=== Counseling ===
Several studies have examined the impact of counseling following perinatal loss. Counseling can take many forms, including family-based bereavement counseling, group counseling, individual counseling, and couples counseling. It may be provided by various professionals, such as psychologists, psychotherapists, psychiatrists, therapists, nurses, midwives, or professional counselors. While not all counseling interventions effectively improve psychological outcomes for bereaved mothers, several studies have demonstrated positive results. For instance, one semi-experimental study found that grief counseling significantly reduced post-traumatic stress symptoms in mothers after a stillbirth.

=== Social support programs ===
A randomized controlled trial assessed a social support program in which a nurse educated family members on effective listening and support skills. The nurse worked closely with each family to develop a personalized support plan, addressing the pregnant woman's specific needs and circumstances. Once finalized, the plan was shared with the family for implementation. The program significantly improved family support and reduced depression and post-traumatic stress symptoms in women.

=== Mindfulness ===
Mindfulness-based stress reduction programs have been shown to reduce anxiety and depression levels in women who have experienced miscarriage or ectopic pregnancies in a randomized controlled trial.

== Awareness ==
To raise awareness of perinatal loss and support affected families, many countries observe a dedicated day of remembrance. October 15 is recognized as Pregnancy and Infant Loss Remembrance Day and is observed in countries including Canada, the United States, Australia, Ireland, and the United Kingdom, where the observance has been extended to a week. The day provides an opportunity for families to remember and honor their children who have passed away. Observances include candle-lighting vigils such as the Wave of Light and commemorative events like the Walk to Remember. These events provide a space for bereaved parents to share their grief and connect with others, with the aim of raising public awareness and encouraging dialogue about the prevalence of baby loss.

== See also ==
- Reproductive loss
- Miscarriage and grief
- Sands (charity) – UK charity supporting families after baby loss
