= Reproductive loss =

Response to failed procreation

Reproductive loss, sometimes reproductive disappointment or reproductive grief, describes a potential emotional response to unsuccessful attempts at human reproduction or family-building. These experienced losses may include involuntary childlessness generally, pregnancy loss from all causes (including ectopic pregnancy, spontaneous abortion, induced abortion, and traumatic injury), perinatal death, stillbirth, infecundity and infertility from all causes (including voluntary, coerced or accidental sterilization, and post-menopausal infertility), failed attempts to conceive, failed fertility treatments, failed gestational surrogacy procedures, and losses related to all dimensions of the adoption process. Responses to miscarriage, stillbirth, selective reduction and neonatal death are a subtype of reproductive loss called perinatal bereavement.

Reproductive loss is categorized as a non-definite loss that elicits as unique grief response and can be prone to social grief disenfranchisement. Responses to reproductive loss may be gender-specific. However, per the Journal of Social Philosophy, processing these experiences is complicated by the lack of "settled cultural—or philosophical—understanding of what exactly is bad or grief-worthy about the death of an embryo/fetus or the failure of a pregnancy to produce a surviving child." Perinatal losses have been described as uniquely ambiguous in that they are "loss of a future with a family member who has not yet been integrated into family life yet maintains a psychological presence within the family system." The ambiguity of the reproductive loss may be central to its experience of the bereaved; Maureen Corrigan called stillbirth a "nightmare that hasn't been quite categorized."

Scholarship in the journal Social Work has argued that reproductive losses can be "significant life course events that may affect identity, social role, self-image, and conceptualization of a woman's reproductive history and human sexuality across the entire range of practice settings." L. Serene Jones of Yale Divinity School found that both American mainline Protestant and feminist communities had little discourse on the concept of reproductive loss or grief.

Late-term fetal demise has been found to be a risk factor for post-traumatic stress disorder in formerly pregnant women.

Creative works about reproductive loss include the Up opening sequence, the film Private Life, the painting Henry Ford Hospital, the memoir An Exact Replica of a Figment of My Imagination, and the strip "Loss" from the webcomic Ctrl+Alt+Del.

== See also ==
- Reproductive privilege
- Miscarriage and grief
- Shidu (bereavement)
- Mizuko kuyō
- Gender disappointment
