= Miscarriage and grief =

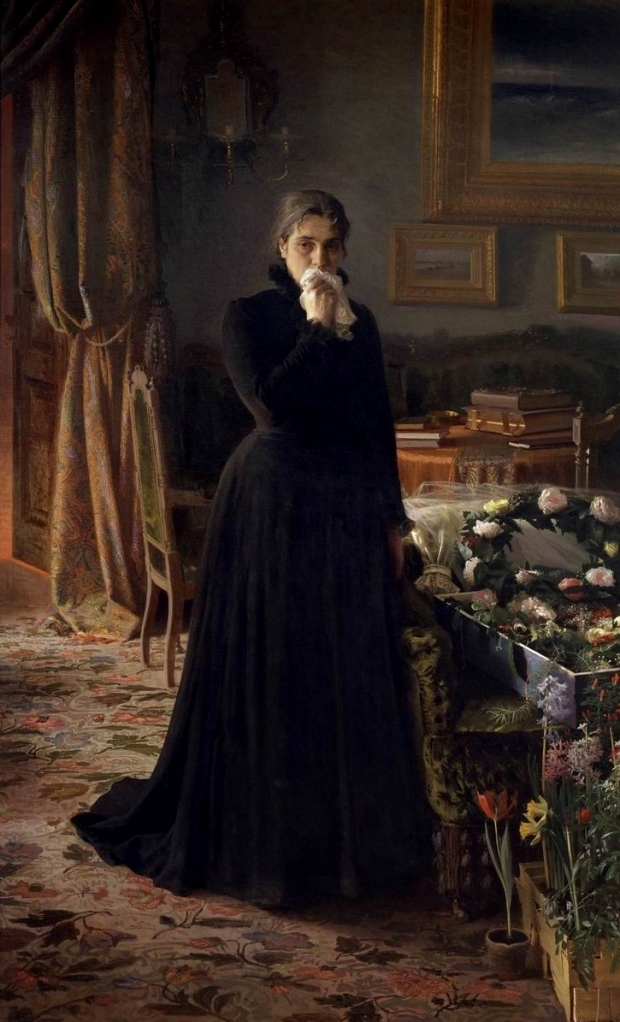
Inconsolable Grief by Ivan Kramskoi

Miscarriage and grief are both an event and subsequent process of grieving that develops in response to a miscarriage. Almost all those experiencing a miscarriage experience grief. This event is often considered to be identical to the death of a child and has been described as traumatic. "Devastation" is another descriptor of miscarriage. Grief is a profound, intensely personal sadness stemming from irreplaceable loss, often associated with sorrow, heartache, anguish, and heartbreak. Sadness is an emotion along with grief, on the other hand, is a response to the loss of the bond or affection was formed and is a process rather than one single emotional response. Grief is not equivalent to depression. Grief also has physical, cognitive, behavioral, social, cultural, and philosophical dimensions. Bereavement and mourning refer to the ongoing state of loss, and grief is the reaction to that loss. Emotional responses may be bitterness, anxiety, anger, surprise, fear, and disgust and blaming others; these responses may persist for months. Self-esteem can be diminished as another response to miscarriage. Not only does miscarriage tend to be a traumatic event, women describe their treatment afterwards to be worse than the miscarriage itself.

A miscarriage can often be "heart-breaking". A miscarriage can affect the women, husband, partner, siblings, grandparents, the whole family system and friends. Almost all those experiencing a miscarriage go through a grieving process. Serious emotional impact is usually experienced immediately after the miscarriage. Some may go through the same loss when an ectopic pregnancy is terminated. In some, the realization of the loss can take weeks. Providing family support to those experiencing the loss can be challenging because some find comfort in talking about the miscarriage while others may find the event painful to discuss. The father of the baby can have the same sense of loss. Expressing feelings of grief and loss can sometimes be harder for men. Some women are able to begin planning their next pregnancy after a few weeks of having the miscarriage. For others, planning another pregnancy can be difficult. Organizations exist that provide information and counselling to help those who have had a miscarriage. Some women have a higher risk of developing prolonged grief and complicated grief than others. A factor that can affect grief for men is finding help in an environment that is traditionally women-focused for maternity care and support.

== Psychological impact ==
Miscarriage has an emotional effect and can also lead to psychological disorders. One discorder that can develop is primary maternal preoccupation. This is defined as a " ...'special psychiatric condition' in which the pregnant woman identifies with her baby, highlights the crisis a woman faces when the baby with whom she is preoccupied and identified dies..." Grieving manifests itself differently for each woman after miscarriage. It may often go unrecognized. The grief that follows a miscarriage resembles, but is not the same as, the grief experienced after the loss of a family member. Disbelief, depression, anger, and yearning, are described as being a part of the normal grieving process. These reactions remain from three to nine months after the loss. Forty-one percent of parents experience a normal, expected decline in grief in the first two years while 59% were delayed in the resolution of their grief.

Grieving can create feelings of loneliness. This grieving has been called a type of psychological trauma. Other serious consequences can develop including depression, anxiety disorder, post-traumatic stress disorder, and somatoform disorder. These responses all are associated with grieving after a miscarriage. Some women are able to complete the grieving process a few weeks after the miscarriage and start anticipating their next pregnancy. Planning another pregnancy is traumatic for others. The impact of a miscarriage can be "crippling" psychologically. Anger can be directed toward those who have had successful pregnancies and children. A woman can grieve the "loss of a future child" and question her own role as a mother. They may blame themselves or their partner for the miscarriage.

Unsuccessful attempts to become pregnant through in vitro fertilization (IVF) can also elicit a similar grief response in women. Those experiencing a late miscarriage may have more significant distress compared to those who have experienced a miscarriage in the first trimester. Even depression can occur.

"Women today...are aught in a unique historical moment: technology encourages them to form emotional attachments to their pregnancies, but society has not developed traditions to cushion the shock when those attachments are shattered."

Descriptions of the miscarriage are expressed in non-clinical terms by those who have experienced the event.

- Angry
- Cheated
- Despair
- Devastating
- Drowning
- Envy
- Guilty
- Lack of acknowledgement
- Not socially acceptable
- Numbness
- Pregnancy loss
- Shame
- Shocked
- Sorrow
- Stunned

=== Trauma ===
Miscarriage has been found to be a traumatic event and a major loss for women. Pregnancy loss, including induced abortion is a risk factor for mental illness. The impact of miscarriage can be underestimated. The trauma can be compounded if the miscarriage was accompanied by visible and relatively large amounts of blood loss. Counseling can be offered but effective interventions to assist in recovery have been difficult to identify due to the reports of efficacy and ineffective counseling. Comparisons are hard to make. Despite the lack of studies that describe effective interventions for those with grief after a miscarriage, some clinicians still offer counselling and follow-up to help women recover and adapt to the loss.

Recommendations to help recover from the event include:

- Turning to loved ones and friends for support. Sharing feelings and asking for help when needed.
- Talking to the partner about the miscarriage.
- Keeping in mind that men and women cope with loss in different ways.
- Making good choices for health and well-being such as: eating healthy foods, keeping active, and getting enough sleep to help restore energy.
- Joining a support group. A support group might help with feelings of being alone in the loss.
- Doing something in remembrance of the baby.
- Seeking help from a grief counselor, especially if the grief doesn't ease with time.

Generally, the impact of experiencing miscarriage is underestimated. Other methods used to promote recovery are relaxation techniques, guided imagery, and "thought-stopping". Even Gestalt role-playing has been used. Some women can "emotionally relocate the child", redefine a relationship "with the missing child", and engage in "continuing the bond" to incorporate the loss into their life experiences.

Women who have miscarried report that they were dissatisfied with the care they received from physicians and nurses. One observer highlights the insensitivity of some health care providers when they approach the grieving mother "...by playing down her emotion as somehow an irrational response..." Clinicians may not recognize the psychological impact of the miscarriage and can "expect parents to move on with their lives."

Since the experiences of women can vary so widely, sensitive nursing care afterward is appropriate.

== Children and concerns about future pregnancies ==
One emotional response to miscarriage is the strong apprehension that can develop anticipating a subsequent pregnancy. Procreation abilities may also be questioned by the woman. Significant distress can develop in the other children in the family when they think a sibling has died. They may regard this as a baby they did not get to meet. They can also experience grief and guilt find it difficult to express these emotions to their parents. The siblings may feel a need to act as if everything is the same and that they are unaffected in an attempt to protect their parents from their own feelings. Children can also need help, understanding and the ability to make sense of the event. Some things that can help children process grief include allowing them to express themselves or ask questions, becoming involved in the memory process, and more.

== Memorials and burial ==
Rituals that recognize the loss can be important in coping. Family and friends often conduct a memorial or burial service. Hospitals also can provide support and help memorialize the event. Depending on locale others desire to have a private ceremony. The religious faith of the woman and family impacts the grief process. Conversely, the lack of recognition that the miscarriage has occurred by family and friends can be troubling and add to the trauma of the event.

== In culture ==
Grieving after the loss of a child through miscarriage in other cultures can vary from western culture. An individual's culture plays a large role in determining an inappropriate pattern of grief, and it is appropriate to take into account cultural norms before reaching a complicated grief diagnosis. There are cultural differences in emotional levels, how these are expressed and how long they are expressed. External symptoms of grief differ in non-Western cultures, presenting increased somatization. Narratives by Swedish women include their own perception of losing a child. Investigations describe their grief over their miscarriage: "When miscarriage occurs it is not a gore, an embryo, or a fetus they lose, it is their child. They feel that they are the cause of the miscarriage through something they have done, eaten, or thought. They feel abandonment and they grieve for their profound loss; they are actually in bereavement." Native American women have cut their long hair following the death of a family member. The narratives of women tend to coincide with quantified and measurable effects. In women who are induced to have an abortion, an identical grieving process can occur. The emotional responses to a spontaneous abortion (miscarriage) and an elective abortion are sometimes identical. Spanish women experience grief in much the same way in the rest of Western culture. Some women find online forums helpful.

== See also ==
- Reproductive loss
- Perinatal bereavement
- Depression (mood)
- Sorrow (emotion)
- Joie de vivre
- Melancholia
- Mood (psychology)
- Infant mortality
- Miscarriage & Infant Loss Memorial Book

== Bibliography ==
- Leveno, Kenneth (2013). Williams manual of pregnancy complications. New York: McGraw-Hill Medical. ISBN 978-0-07-176562-6.
- Seftel, Laura (2006). Grief unseen: healing pregnancy loss through the arts. London: Jessica Kingsley Publishers. ISBN 978-1-84310-805-4. OCLC 153919942.
- Barnes, Diana (2014). Women's reproductive mental health across the lifespan. Cham: Springer. ISBN 978-3-319-05115-4.
- Christiansen, Ole (2014). Recurrent pregnancy loss. Chichester, West Sussex, UK: John Wiley & Sons. ISBN 978-0-470-67294-5.
