= Detroit Industry Murals =

Series of frescoes by Diego Rivera

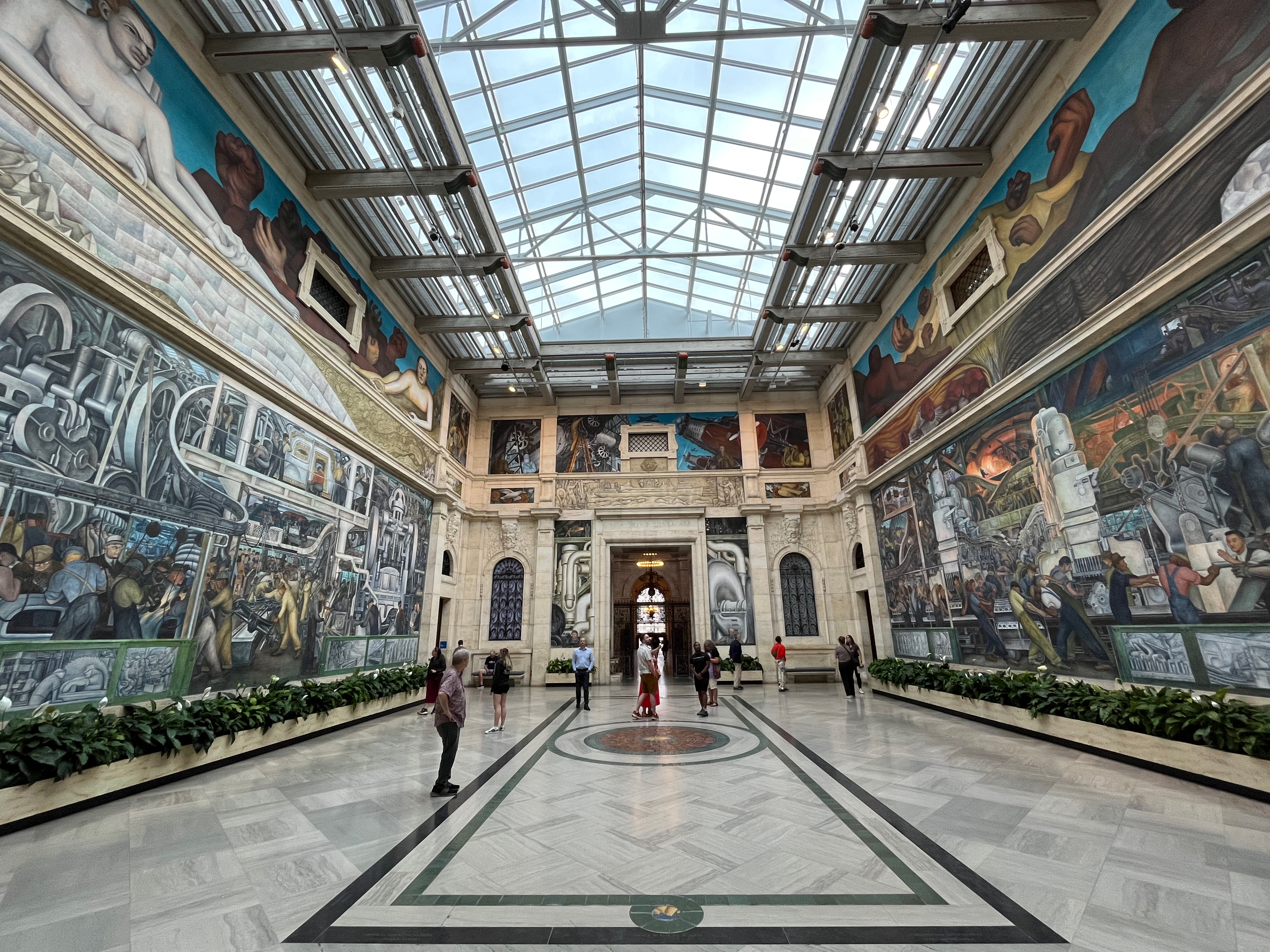
- The Detroit Industry Murals are painted on all four walls of the Rivera Court at the Detroit Institute of Arts
- Artist: Diego Rivera
- Year: 1932–1933
- Medium: Fresco
- Movement: Mexican muralism
- Subject: Industrialization
- Location: Detroit Institute of Arts, Detroit
- Accession: 33.10
- Detroit Industry Murals, Detroit Institute of Arts
- U.S. National Register of Historic Places
- U.S. National Historic Landmark
- NRHP reference No.: 14000279

Significant dates
- Added to NRHP: April 22, 2014
- Designated NHL: April 22, 2014

The Detroit Industry Murals (1932–1933) are a series of frescoes by the Mexican artist Diego Rivera, consisting of twenty-seven panels depicting industry at the Ford Motor Company and in Detroit. Together they surround the interior Rivera Court in the Detroit Institute of Arts. Painted between 1932 and 1933, they were considered by Rivera to be his most successful work. On April 23, 2014, the Detroit Industry Murals were designated a National Historic Landmark.

The two main panels on the North and South walls depict laborers working at Ford Motor Company's River Rouge Plant. Other panels depict advances made in various scientific fields, such as medicine and new technology. The series of murals, taken as a whole, expresses the idea that all actions and ideas are one.

== Commission ==
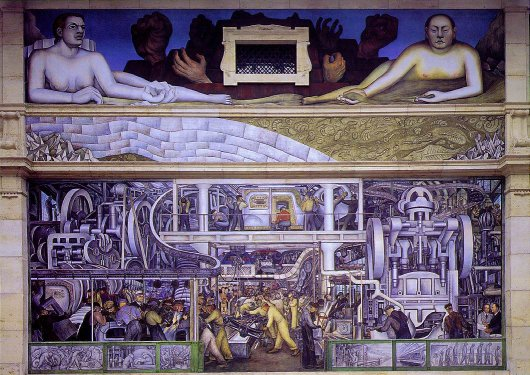
Detroit Industry, South Wall, 1932–33. Detroit Institute of Arts.

In 1932, Wilhelm Valentiner, director of the Detroit Institute of Arts, commissioned Mexican artist Diego Rivera to paint 27 fresco murals depicting the industries of Detroit in the interior courtyard of the museum. Rivera was chosen for the project because he had just completed a mural at the California School of Fine Arts (now the San Francisco Art Institute) that displayed his painterly ability as well as his interest in the modern industrial culture of the United States. As outlined in the terms of the commission, the DIA agreed to pay all expenses toward materials, while Rivera would pay his assistants from his artist's fee. Edsel Ford contributed $20,000 to make the commission possible.

Excerpt from commission proposal to Rivera from Valentiner:

... to help us beautify the museum and give fame to its hall through your great work ... The arts commission will be very glad to have your suggestions of the motifs, which could be selected after you are here. They would be pleased if you could possibly find something out of the industry of the town; but at the end they decided to leave it entirely to you, what you think best to do.

— Wilhelm Valentiner

== The project ==
Rivera started the project by researching the facilities at the Ford River Rouge Complex. He spent three months touring all of the plants, preparing hundreds of sketches and concepts for the mural. The official Rouge plant photographer, W. J. Stettler, aided Rivera's search for visual reference material. Rivera was truly amazed by the technology and modernity of Detroit's plants. Although intrigued with the auto industry and its related elements, he also expressed an interest in the pharmaceutical industry. He spent some time at the Parke-Davis pharmaceutical plant in Detroit to conduct research for his commission at the DIA.

Rivera completed the commission in eight months, a relatively short amount of time for such a large and complex work. To do so, Rivera and his assistants had an exhausting work schedule, routinely working fifteen-hour days without breaks between. Rivera lost 100 lbs over the course of the project because of the rigorous work. He had a reputation for paying his assistants poorly, and at one point they protested for higher pay during the project.

Rivera started working on the mural in 1932, during the Great Depression. In Detroit one out of four laborers were unemployed, and workers at the Ford Motor Company were agitating for improvements to pay and conditions. 6,000 workers went on strike, but their effort was sabotaged. Five men died in violence and other workers were wounded. Rivera was likely inspired by the charged atmosphere of protest against one of the world's most powerful industries.

During this period, Detroit had an advanced industrial economy, and it was the site of the largest manufacturing industry of the world. In 1927, the Ford Motor Company was introducing advanced technological improvements for their assembly line, one of which was the revolutionary automated car assembly line. The Detroit automotive industry was vertically integrated, with the capacity to manufacture every component for their motor cars, something considered an industrial marvel at the time.

In addition, Detroit had factories that produced diverse goods and commodities ranging from steel, electric power, and cement. Although well known for the mass production of motor cars, Detroit also manufactured ships, tractors, and airplanes. This impressive integrated industrial manufacturing center is what Rivera sought to capture in his work at the Detroit Institute of Art; the series was later known as the Detroit Industry Murals.

== North and South walls ==
The two largest murals of the 27 completed by Rivera are located on the north and south walls of the interior court, now known as the Rivera Court. The murals depict the workers at the Ford River Rouge Complex in Dearborn, Michigan.

The two largest murals, on the north and south walls of the court, are considered the climax to the narrative that Rivera depicted in the total of 27 panels. The north wall puts the worker at center and depicts the manufacturing process of Ford's famous 1932 V8 engine. The mural also explores the relationship between man and the machine. In an age of mechanical production, the boundary between man and the machine was a commonly explored theme. While machines were made to imitate the abilities of man, and men had to respond to machines, workers and leaders were concerned about ethical rights for the working-class majority. Rivera also incorporated such elements as images of blasting furnaces that made iron ore, foundries making molds for parts, conveyor belts carrying the cast parts, machining operations, and inspections. Rivera depicted the entire manufacturing process on the large north side mural. On the right and left side he portrayed the chemical industry: juxtaposing scientists producing poison gas for warfare and scientists who are producing vaccines for medical purposes.

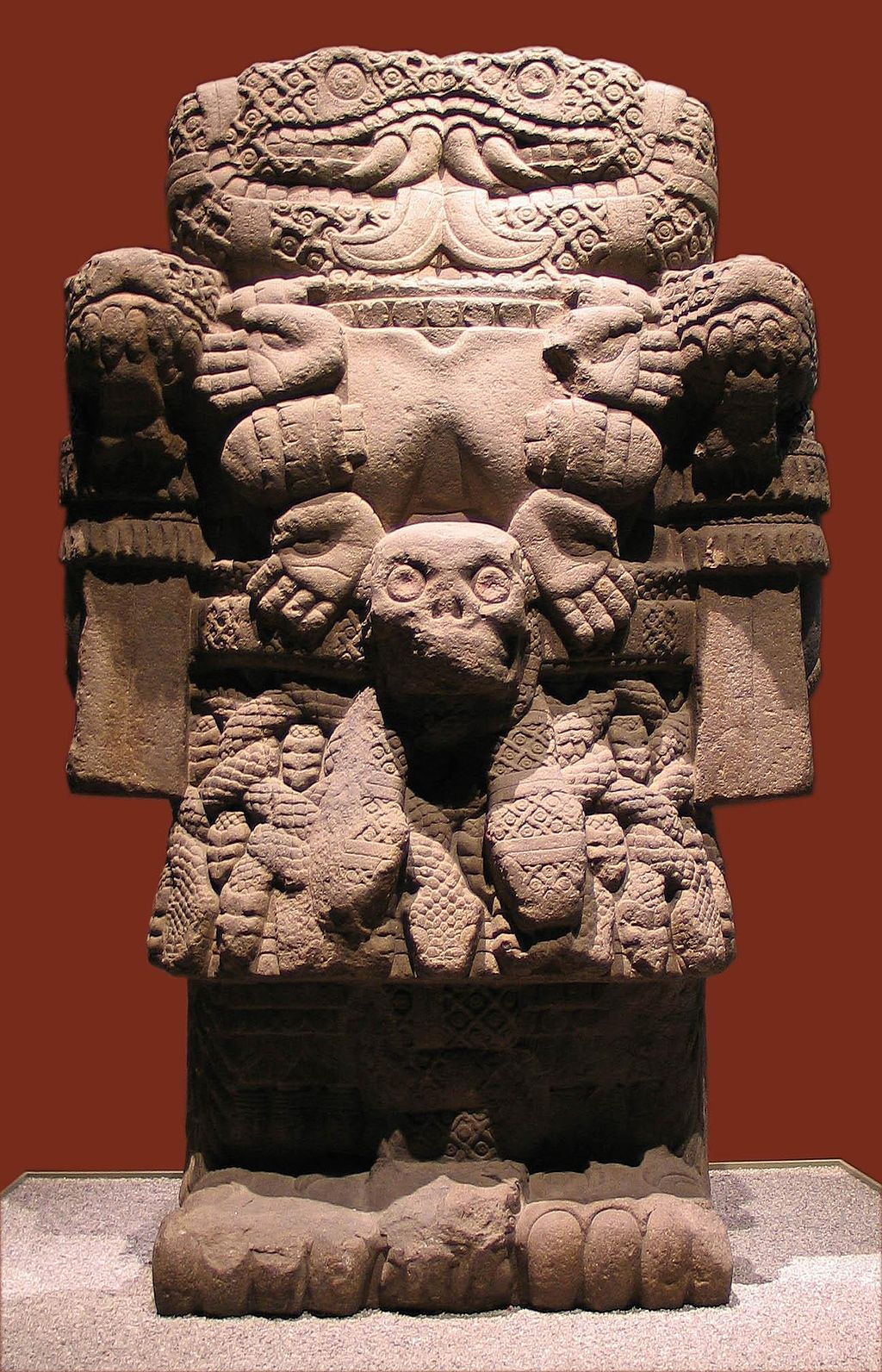
Statue of Coatlicue displayed in National Anthropology Museum in Mexico City.

On the opposite side of the north wall, Rivera depicts the manufacturing process of the exterior automobile parts, focusing on technology as an important quality of the future. He allegorizes this concept through one of the huge parts-pressing machines depicted in the mural. The machine is meant to symbolize the creation story of the Aztec goddess Coatlicue.

In Aztec mythology indigenous to Mexico, Coatlicue was the mother of the gods. She gave birth to the moon, stars, and Huitzilopochtli, the god of the sun and war. The story of Coatlicue was important to the Aztecs and summarized the complexity of their culture and religious beliefs. Critics have suggested that Rivera contrasted the Aztec story with the role and place of modern technology. It had become so important culturally that at times it was supported and defended as passionately as a new religion promising a better future to mankind.

== Notoriety ==
Rivera was a controversial choice for this art project, as he was known to follow Marxist philosophy. The Depression had disrupted American faith in industrial and economic progress. Some critics viewed the murals as Marxist propaganda. When the murals were completed, the Detroit Institute for the Arts invited various clergymen to comment. Catholic and Episcopalian clergy condemned the murals as blasphemous. The Detroit News protested that they were "vulgar" and "un-American". As a result of the controversy, 10,000 people visited the museum on a single Sunday, and the city increased its budget.

One panel on the North wall features a Christ-like child figure with golden hair reminiscent of a halo. Flanking it on the right is a horse (rather than the donkey of Christian tradition); on the left is an ox. Directly below are several sheep, an animal included in traditional Nativity scenes. It also represents Christ as Agnus Dei (Lamb of God). A doctor fills the role of Joseph and a nurse that of Mary; together they are administering a vaccination to the child. In the background three scientists, like biblical Magi, are engaged in what appears to be a research experiment. This part of the fresco is clearly a modern take on traditional images of the Holy Family, but some critics interpret it as parody rather than homage.

Some art historians have suggested that Rivera's patron Edsel Ford stoked the controversy to generate publicity about the artwork. An exhibit at DIA in 2015 explored this theory.

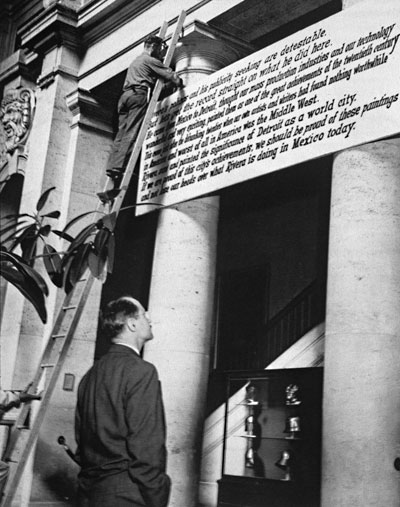
The disclaimer sign erected in the 1950s adjacent to the Rivera murals

At its unveiling, this panel so offended some members of Detroit's religious community that they demanded it be destroyed, but commissioner Edsel Ford and DIA Director Wilhelm Valentiner held firm. It remains in place today.

During the 1950s, the DIA erected a sign above the entrance to the Rivera Court that read:

Rivera's politics and his publicity seeking are detestable. But let's get the record straight on what he did here. He came from Mexico to Detroit, thought our mass production industries and our technology wonderful and very exciting, painted them as one of the great achievements of the twentieth century. This came after the debunking twenties when our artists and writers found nothing worthwhile in America and worst of all in America was the Middle West. Rivera saw and painted the significance of Detroit as a world city. If we are proud of this city's achievements, we should be proud of these paintings and not lose our heads over what Rivera is doing in Mexico today.

== See also ==
- List of works by Diego Rivera
- List of National Historic Landmarks in Michigan
- National Register of Historic Places listings in Wayne County, Michigan
- Man at the Crossroads (1934)
- Henry Ford Hospital, 1932 painting by Frida Kahlo
- Diego Rivera
