= Fertility in art =

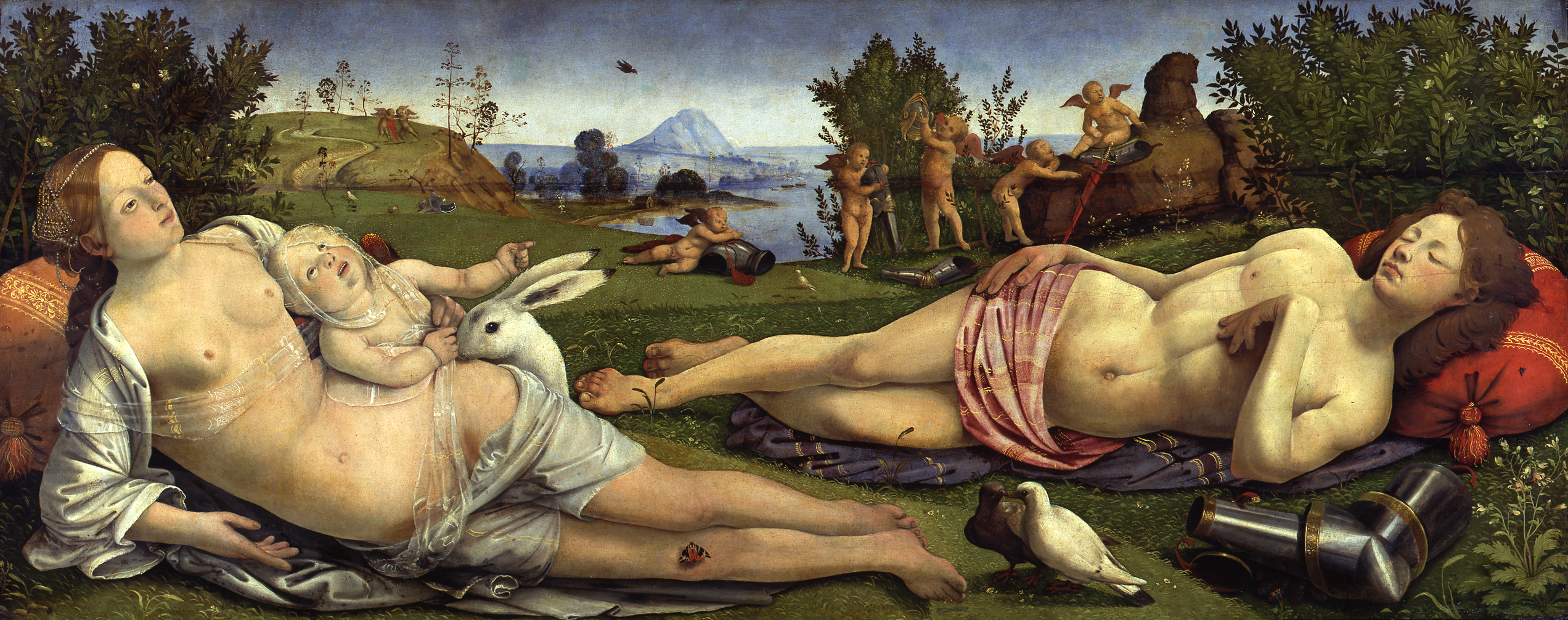
Piero di Cosimo: Venus, Mars and Cupid, Cupid (lying on Venus) clings to a white rabbit, a symbol of birth and fertility

Fertility in art refers to any artistic work representing or portraying fertility, which usually refers to successful breeding among humans, although it may also mean successful agriculture and animal husbandry. It includes engravings, drawings, paintings, sculptures, figurines, portraits and even literary works. In Paleolithic art, fertility is usually associated with figurines with exaggerated parts of human anatomy.

Many civilisations in history believed in fertility deities. In Classical mythology, Gaia (to the Greeks) or Terra (to the Romans), the personification of Earth, is associated with female fertility. Women are often depicted with a ripe bosom, a child-bearing hip and a nude body in some cases. Animals that reproduce prolifically are also seen in art depicting fertility.

== Traditional cultures ==
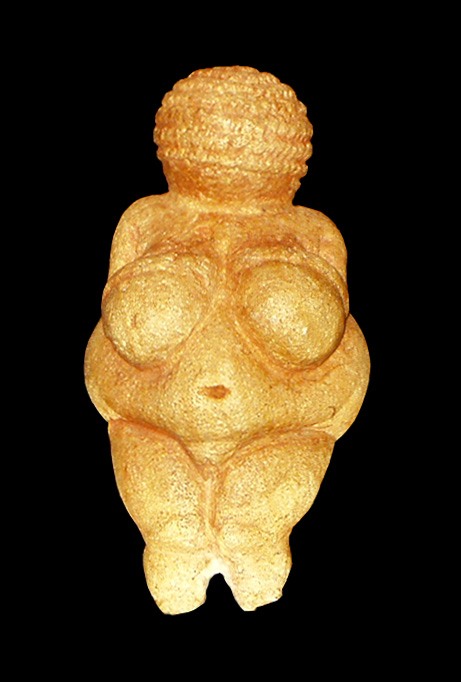
Venus of Willendorf, considered to be an example of fertility in art.

Fertility was present in art traditionally in many different forms. These include ceramic figures from some Pre-Columbian cultures, and a few figures from most of the ancient Mediterranean cultures. Many of these seem to be connected with fertility. Palielothic statuettes had round bellies, short heads and short, pointed legs. They also exaggerate the hips, breasts, thighs, or vulva of the subject.

Two of the earliest known possible depictions of fertility in art are the Venus of Willendorf (c. 25,000 BCE), an oolitic limestone figurine of a woman whose breasts and hips have been exaggerated to emphasise her fertility found in Austria and the Fertility Goddess of Cernavoda (c. 5,000 BCE) found in Romania, a small figurine that is meant to possibly show fertility. Historians consider these figurines to be goddesses. It is believed that worshippers would push the pointed legs into the earth to erect a temporary shrine for the goddess. The rotundity and obesity of these figurines were seen as attractive in early times when food was scarce.

== Western art ==
=== Early forms ===
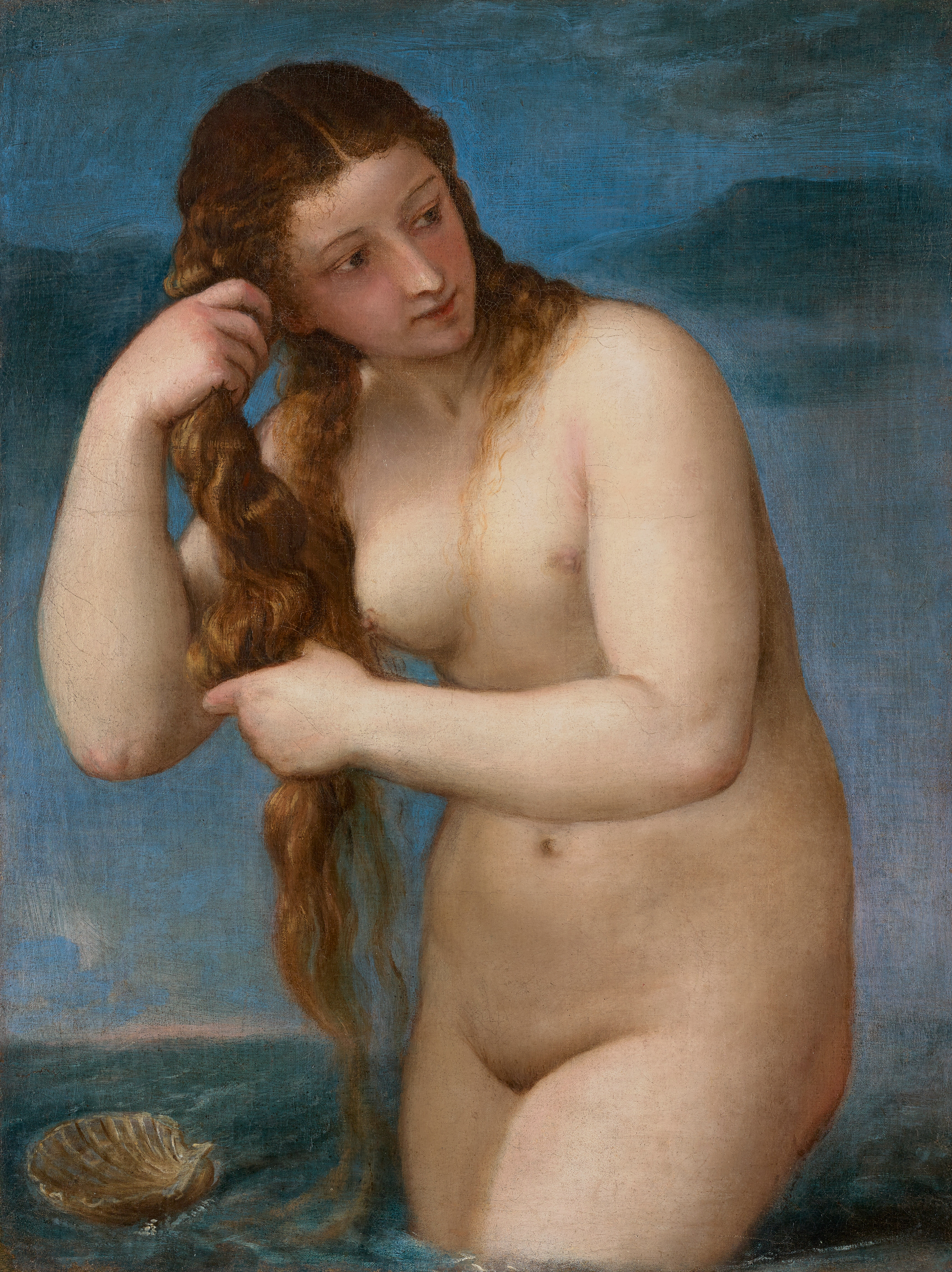
Titian, copy of the Venus Anadyomene

Fertility is often shown in artworks related to Classical mythology. Paintings of the Greek goddess of love Aphrodite (Venus to the Romans) often portray her as sexual and fertile. Hesiod's Theogony states that Aphrodire (Venus) was born from the sperm/foam of the castrated genitals of Uranus. Venus Anadyomene is a painting by Apelles that shows Aphrodite rising from the sea. The original painting is now lost, but a colossal copy of the painting exists, painted by the artist Titian and known as Venus Anadyomene by Titian. It depicts Venus (Aphrodite) rising from the sea and wringing her wet hair after her birth, a pose inspired by an account of the original painting by Apelles. Demeter, the Greek goddess of agriculture, grain crops, fertility and motherly relationships is often shown carrying a basket of apples in sculptures, which are meant to show fertility.

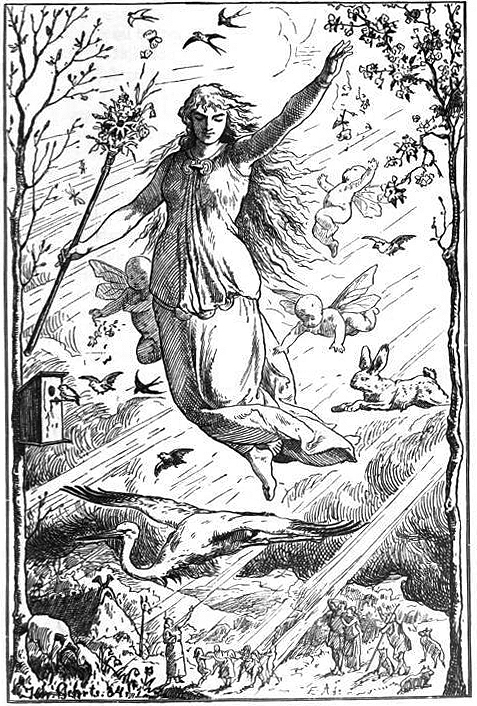
Johannes Gehrts: Eostre, the Germanic goddess flies through the heavens surrounded by Roman-inspired putti, beams of light, rabbits and birds. Germanic people look up at the goddess from the realm below.

Hares are often portrayed in art as a symbol of rebirth and fertility. The Germanic goddess Eostre, whose themes are fertility and rebirth, is often surrounded by hares in art. In Christianity, white rabbits are considered to be symbols of rebirth and fertility and are seen on a wing of the high altar in Freiburg Minster, where they are playing at the feet of two pregnant women, Mary and Elizabeth. In Jan van Eyck's 1434 Arnolfini Portrait, a carving of St. Margaret of Antioch (patron saint of childbirth) appears in the center background of the painting. The presence of this symbol in the painting either promises fertility in the marriage or announces the pregnancy of the bride.

=== Modern ===
Paula Modersohn-Becker's series of self-portraits showing her pregnant even before she had actually been so represent her fertility.

Rembrandt's The Jewish Bride is a painting of a couple joined in love. Despite the title, none of the subjects in the painting are Jewish. The Painting portrays the fertility of the young couple, particularly that of the woman.

The shoe tied to the happy couple's car can be seen to represent the fertile vagina, as with The Old Woman Who Lived in a Shoe, a nursery rhyme.

In Botticelli's Primavera, on one hand the Three Graces represented by nubile young women embody the sexual powers of springtime while opposite them Flora, the goddess of Spring is a symbol of motherhood and, by her distribution of the roses gathered in her skirt, believed to represent the good things of life.

In Picasso' paintings of Marie-Thérèse Walter, everywhere there is green, the colour of fertility and nature's renewal. In his series of sleeping nudes, Picasso may have been influenced by the much reproduced Hal Saflieni Reclining Woman and the Venuses of Lespugue and Willendorf, which with their heavy, ripe, bulging forms can be viewed as ancestresses of Picasso's images of female fecundity.

=== Literature ===
In The Bacchae, an ancient Greek tragedy written by Athenian playwright Euripides, Dionysus is mentioned as a male fertility god that represented a special kind of vitality that is sometimes referred to as the Life Force. It is described a force which, in itself, is neither good nor bad, but one that simply exists.

When at the close of Possession: A Romance, a novel by A. S. Byatt, the two lovers Randolph Henry Ash and Christabel LaMotte finally unite in the midst of a great storm. They wake the next day to find that the whole world had a strange new smell. It is described as 'a green smell, a smell of shredded leaves and oozing resin, of crushed wood and splashed sap, a tart smell, which bore some relation to the smell of bitten apples.' It was the described as the smell of death and destruction, however, it was said to smell fresh, lively and hopeful.

== See also ==
- Fertility and religion
- Fertility rite
- Infertility and childlessness stigmas
