= Fertility and religion =

Fertility deities, rites and symbols

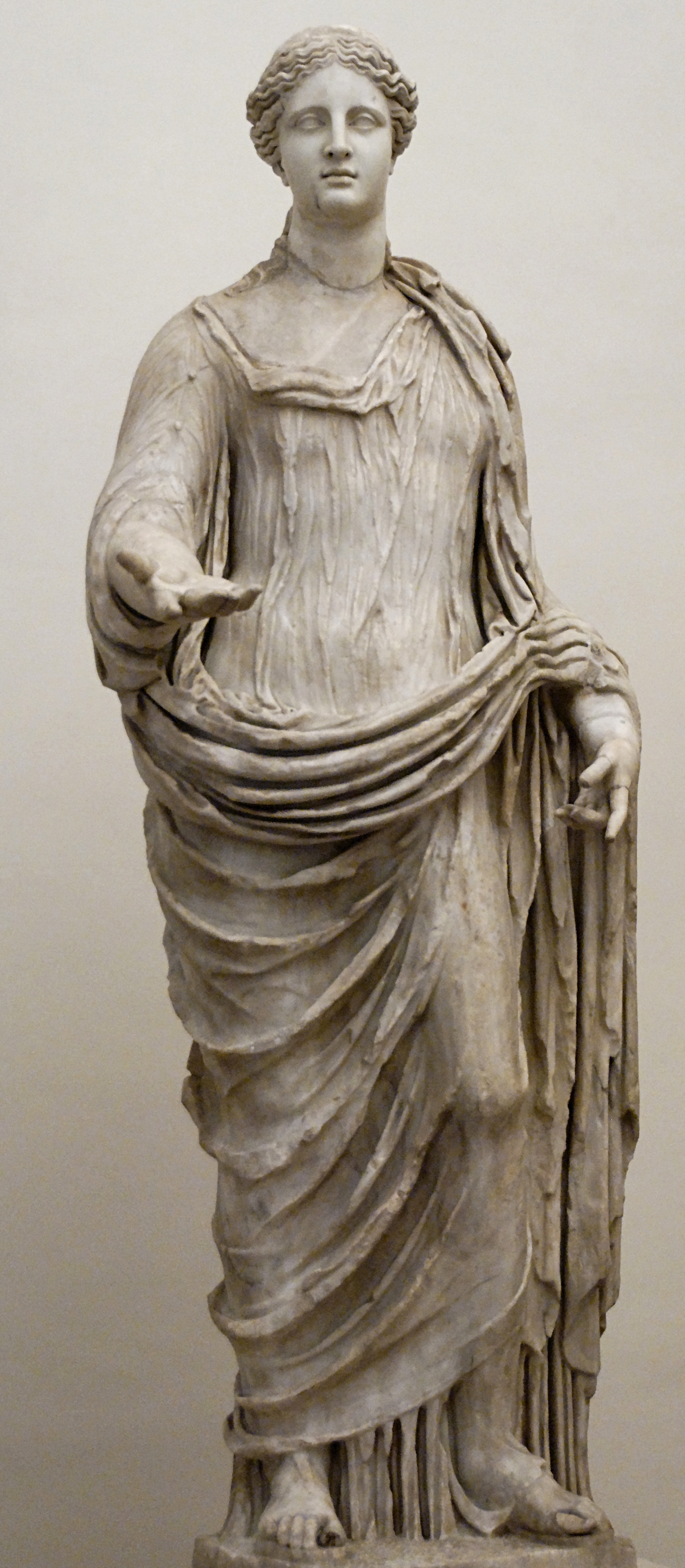
Demeter, the greek goddess of fertility

Fertility was often mentioned in many mythological tales. In mythology, fertility deities exist in different belief systems or religions.

== Fertility deities ==
A fertility deity is a god or goddess in mythology associated with fertility, pregnancy, and birth. In some cases these deities are directly associated with sex, and in others they simply embody related attributes.

== Fertility rites ==
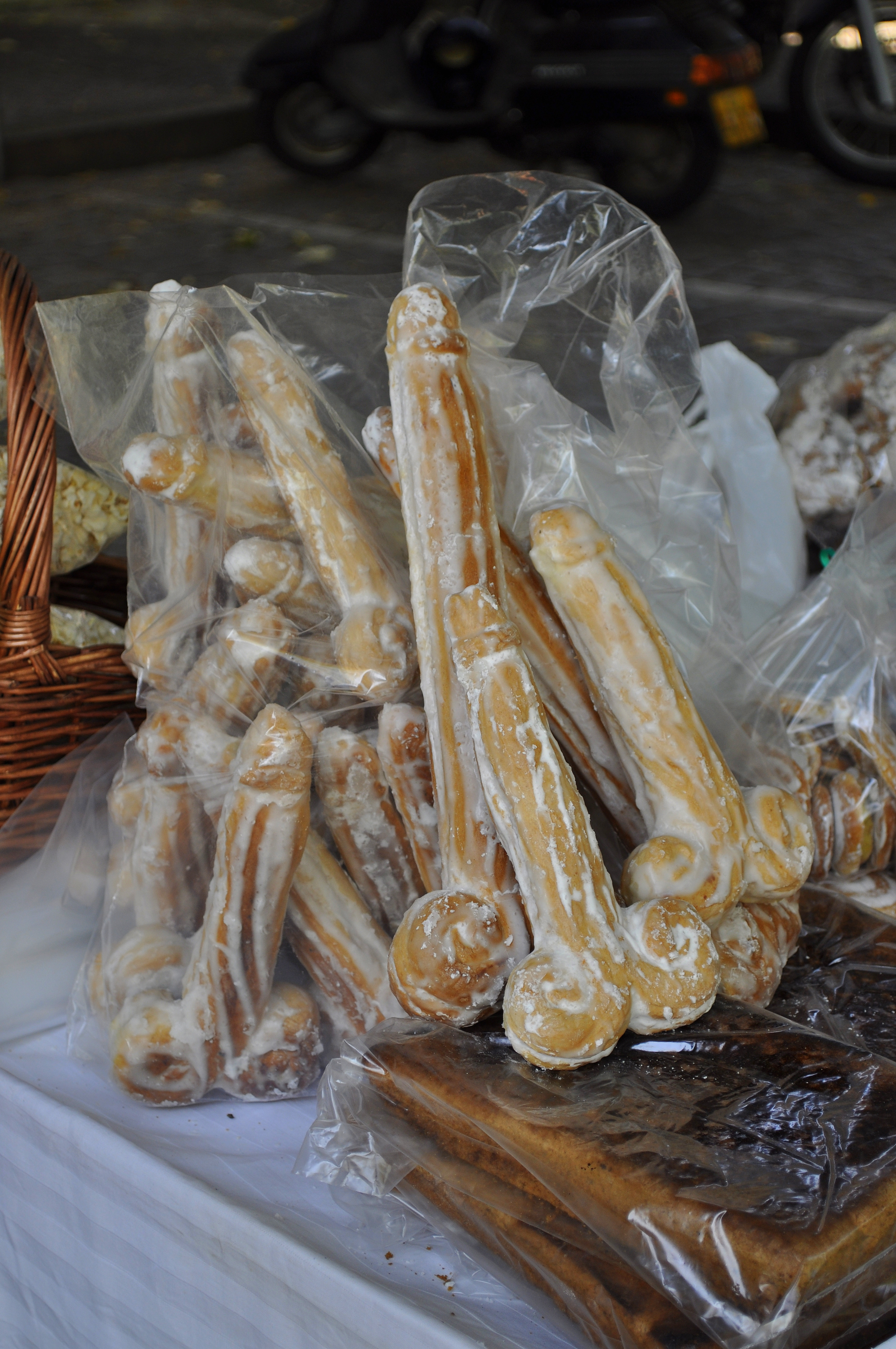
Sao Goncalo Pastries. Erotic pastry from Portugal claimed to have originated with Celtic fertility rites

Fertility rites are religious rituals that reenact sexual acts actually or symbolically. They may include sacrifices of animals and at times humans.

Demeter was the central deity in fertility rites held in classical Greece. Her rites included celebrating the change of seasons. Most women's festivals related in some way to woman's proper function as a fertile being (believed to allow women to promote the fertility of crops). Because of his link to the grape harvest, however, it is not surprising to see Dionysus associated with Demeter and Kore in the Eleusinian Mysteries.

In ancient Phoenicia, a special sacrifice was conducted in the harvest season to reawaken the spirit of the vine; while another winter fertility rite was performed to restore the spirit of the withering vine. The sacrifice included cooking a kid in the milk of its mother, a Canaanite custom which Mosaic law condemned and formally forbade.

According to Ibn Ishaq, the Kaaba was formerly worshipped as a female deity. Circumambulation was often performed naked by male and sometimes female pilgrims, and worship associated with fertility goddesses.

== Fertility symbols ==
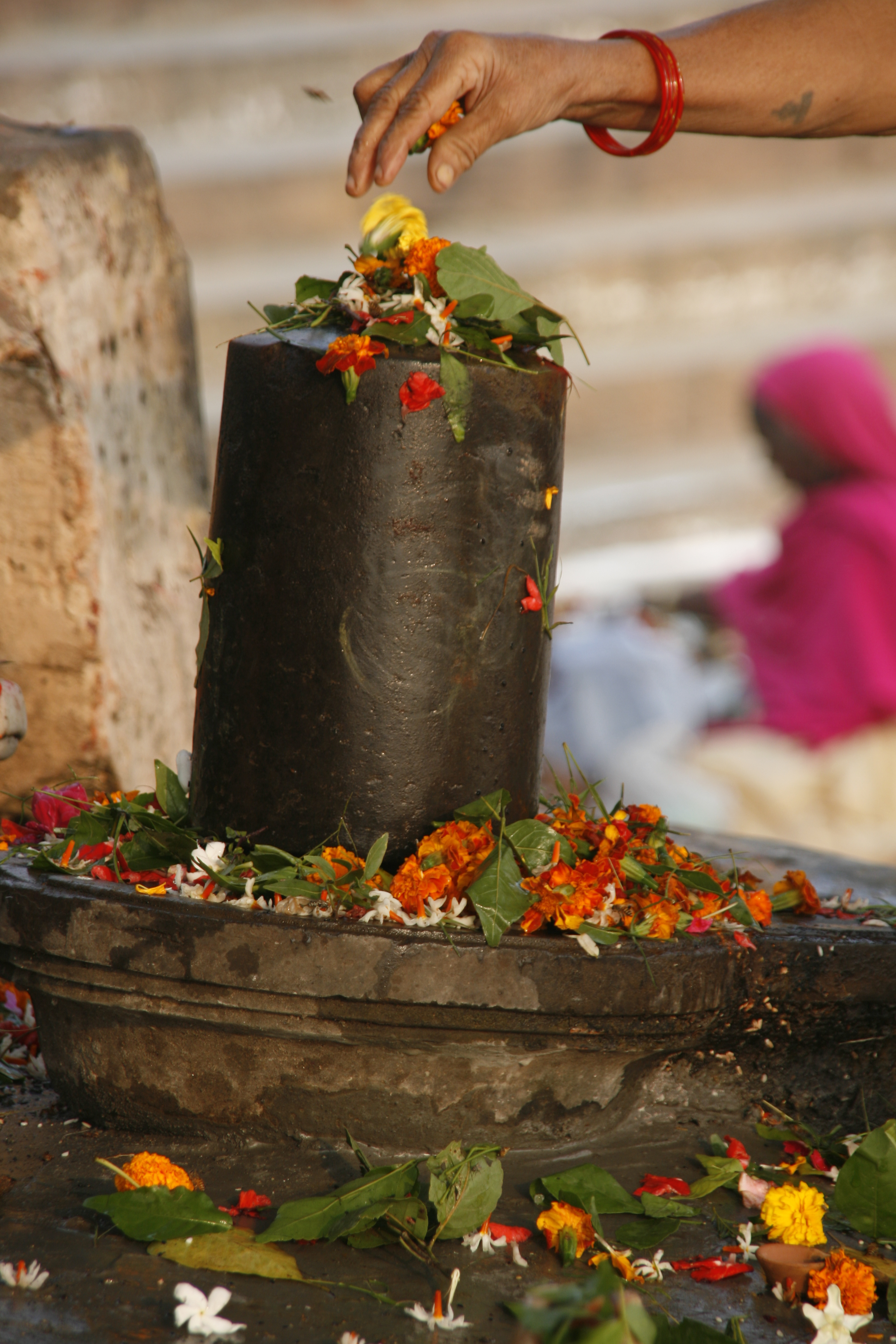
A typical Shiva lingam

Fertility symbols were generally considered to have been used since Prehistoric times for encouraging fertility in women, although it is also used to show creation in some cultures.

Wedding cakes are a form of fertility symbols. In ancient Rome, the custom was for the groom to break a cakes over the bride's head to symbolize the end of the bride's virginal state, ensure fertility, and the beginning of her husband's power over her.

Fertility symbols were used by Native Americans, the most common being a supernatural figure called Kokopelli, a fertility deity usually depicted as a hunchback, dancing flute player carrying a sack also shown with a large phallus. The deity presides over childbirth and agriculture.

In Hinduism, Lingam is the most powerful fertility symbol, showing the critical union of Shiva and Shakti. Shiva is depicted with River Ganges and moon on his head. He wears garlands of snakes called Naga. The Ganga, moon and snakes are fertility symbols, and associated with fertility rituals in Hinduism.

In the Judeo-Christian bible, the Song of Songs emphasizes the navel as an important element of a woman's beauty. It contains imagery similar to that in the love songs of ancient Egyptian literature. Song of Songs 7:2 states: "Your navel is a rounded bowl." The verse preceding the line mentioning the navel (Song of Songs 7:1) states, "your rounded thighs are like jewels, the work of a master hand", and the verse following states, "Your belly is a heap of wheat." Thus the treatment of the navel appears placed textually in between the description of the curves of a woman through thigh and the stomach or midriff. "Belly" also suggests the womb, and the combination of the imagery of the womb with that of wheat suggests the link between romance, eroticism and fertility through the imagery of the navel and curvaceous thighs. These passages also celebrate a curvaceous stomach and midriff and plumpness as aspects of female physical attractiveness.

The Bible states that the purpose of sex is to fertilize a woman, and God, for example, punishes Onan, who wastes his semen, with death.

The religious discourse, in particular Christians, Muslim and Jew values the virginity of the young girl before the marriage and associates the deflowering with the idea of fertility. On the wedding night, is the first time that the bride and groom have sex with each other. The young couple is advised and even ordered to have sex on the first night after marriage.

== See also ==
- Infertility and childlessness stigmas
- Fertility in art
