= Wilhelm Valentiner =

German-American art historian, art critic and museum administrator

William Reinhold Valentiner (May 2, 1880 – September 6, 1958) was a German-American art historian, art critic and museum curator and director. He was educated and trained in Europe, first working at the Mauritshuis in The Hague and at museums in Berlin.

In 1907 he moved to the United States to become the first curator of the department of decorative arts in the Metropolitan Museum in New York City. After returning to Europe to serve in the Imperial German Army in World War I, Valentiner later was appointed to other positions in the US. From the mid-1920s, he strongly influenced the development of museum administration in the United States.

He served as director of the Detroit Institute of Arts in Michigan, from 1924 to 1945. Valentiner became a naturalized US citizen about 1930 and lived in the country for nearly half his life in total. During the early 1930s, he commissioned Mexican artist Diego Rivera to create a 27-panel mural series about Detroit industry for an interior court of the museum, and gained the patronage of Edsel Ford for the project. While controversial in content, the work attracted thousands of new visitors and led to the museum being granted a larger budget by the city.

Valentiner is especially known for his writings on Flemish and Dutch painting.

== Life ==
William Valentiner was born at Karlsruhe (Baden) and attended local schools. He studied at Heidelberg under Henry Thode, and in the Netherlands with Cornelis Hofstede de Groot and with Abraham Bredius. He served as the latter's assistant at the Gallery of The Hague (Mauritshuis).

In 1905 he was called to Berlin by Wilhelm Bode, under whom he worked at the Kaiser Friedrich Museum and the Kunstgewerbemuseum Berlin. In 1906 he published his dissertation on Rembrandt, which he had started in 1904: Rembrandt auf der Lateinschule.

New York City

In 1907 he was appointed as the first curator of the department of decorative arts in the Metropolitan Museum in New York City. Under his supervision, this department became one of the foremost in the world.

World War I

At the start of World War I, Valentiner returned to Germany to serve in the army. After service at the front in 1916, he was appointed to the general staff in Berlin.

He was the father of Brigitta Valentiner, and the father in-law of Harry Bertoia.

== American museums ==
Following the end of the war, Valentiner was offered a position in Detroit, Michigan, where he served for more than two decades. He became a naturalized American citizen around 1930 and lived in the United States for the remainder of his life.

Detroit

From 1924–1945 he was appointed first as advisor and then Director of the Detroit Institute of Arts, one of the cultural institutions that expanded during the city's boom years. The museum was founded as the Detroit Museum of Art in 1885, and was renamed Detroit Institute of Arts in 1919. Under his leadership the museum developed into one of the leading art institutions in the United States. His acquisitions and exhibitions in Detroit were products of his wide-ranging scholarship. He was a friend of Edsel Ford and conducted private seminars on the history of art for Ford's family.

He commissioned Mexican artist Diego Rivera to create a series of murals after having seen his work in San Francisco, California. He convinced Ford to be a patron and underwrite the cost of the murals. Titled Detroit Industry, they were revolutionary in content for Detroit at the time and generated considerable local controversy.

Valentiner developed an expert staff of curators, a vision of an encyclopedic collection, and the museum as a resource for the city, the state, and the Midwest. In 1945 he had to resign from his post in Detroit due to a city age restriction in the civil service.

Los Angeles

He was a director at The Museum of History, Science, and Art and was instrumental in the development of that museum's successor: the Los Angeles County Museum of Art. He was also instrumental in the creation of the J. Paul Getty Museum.

North Carolina

In 1955 Valentiner was appointed as the first Director of the North Carolina Museum of Art in Raleigh, the capital. He held this position until his death in September 1958.

== Works ==
Wilhelm Valentiner published:

- Rembrandt auf der Lateinschule, Jahrbuch der preußischen Kunstsammlungen 27 (1906)
- Rembrandt (1907), with Bode
- Altholländische Genre Zeichungen (1908), with Bode
- Rembrandt : des Meisters Gemälde in 643 Abbildungen (1908), with Adolf Rosenberg
- The Art of the Low Countries, translated by Mrs. Schuyler Van Rensselaer (1914)
- The Last Years of Michelangelo (1914)
- Rembrandt: wiedergefundene Gemälde, 1910–1922, in 128 Abbildungen (1923)
- Frans Hals, des Meisters Gemälde in 322 Abbildungen, Zweite, Neu Bearbeitete Auflage, Deutsche Verlags-Anstalt Stuttgart, Berlin, und Leipzig, 1923
- Frans Hals paintings in America, 1936
- The Origins of Modern Sculpture, 1946
- Rembrandt and Spinoza: A Study of the Spiritual Conflicts in Seventeenth-Century Holland, London: Phaidon Press (1957)
