= Stratified reproduction =

Stratified reproduction is a widely used social scientific concept, created by Shellee Colen, that describes imbalances in the ability of people of different races, ethnicities, nationalities, classes, and genders to reproduce and nurture their children.

== Concept ==
Globally, women are confined to different societal standards and available choices on reproduction. The capacity to control one's reproductive choices is unequally distributed among race, sexual orientation, gender, class and socioeconomic status. For example, contraception and abortions can be illegal or difficult to obtain depending on location or socioeconomic status. Similarly, women's experience of childbirth and expectations of childbearing can vary across cultures.

Stratified reproduction asserts that certain categories of people are encouraged and coerced to reproduced while others are systematically discouraged to do so. Stratified reproduction also extends beyond the aspect of reproduction to the extent of conception, contraception, prenatal medical care, childcare, and the mother's role in their child's life.

In 1984, Shellee Colen coined the term "stratified reproduction" when studying West Indian childcare workers in New York City, who typically worked for wealthier white families. Colen highlighted differences between white and West Indian mothers’ ability to choose how they each care for their children. The white mothers hire a nanny to carry out the routine tasks of childcare while the West Indian mothers forgo the ability to raise their children so that they can financially support them. Colen drew the conclusion that child birth and childcare is experienced, valued, and rewarded differently depending on a mother's socioeconomic status and availability of resources. Researchers use the concept to describe the "power relations by which some categories of people are empowered to nurture and reproduce, while others are disempowered," as Rayna Rapp and Faye D. Ginsburg defined the term in 1995.

== Studies using the concept ==
Since the emergence of the term stratified reproduction, researchers have applied its concepts to analyze the different effects of varying social factors on reproduction and childcare. Rayna Rapp and Faye D. Ginsburg pioneered the application of stratified reproduction to different societies to emphasize the variation to which women experienced reproduction and childcare. In Rapp and Ginsburg's book, Conceiving the New World Order: The Global politics of Reproduction, they discuss several societies that limited women's choice on reproduction and childcare due to socioeconomic factors. They touch on Shellee Colen's research on West Indian nannies in New York and how they are unable to participate in their own child's childcare, because they must immigrate to America to find work to support their family. They also include Gail Kligman's research on abortion bans in Romania under Ceausescu’s rule. State policy required the Romanian women to birth at least four children in hopes of increasing the population for a more efficient socialist country. They also discuss China’s limit on the maximum number of children per household, and low-income African American women’s struggle to obtain proper contraceptives and abortions. Rapp and Ginsburg concluded that “global and local socioeconomic relations that form the context for stratified reproduction, whereby ‘some categories of people are empowered to nurture and reproduce, while others are disempowered’”, and that cultural ideologies and state policies reinforce the stratified reproduction implanted by socioeconomic factors.

The scope of use of the stratified reproduction framework is not limited to women’s access to contraceptives or lack thereof. Researchers are applying stratified reproduction to the health of the mothers and children. Infertility has also been linked to the effects of stratified reproduction. Scarce financial resources deters mothers from being able to reach effective medical services to help prevent infertility.

== Infertility options and stratification ==
=== Medical infertility treatments ===
Infertility is just one aspect of stratified reproduction. Although it is estimated that 186 million people worldwide are affected by infertility, technology can be able to assist those who are infertile. In-Vitro-Fertilization (IVF) is one assisted reproductive technique (ART) that is used. IVF was developed over 30 years ago to help women with blocked or damaged fallopian tubes. IVF has helped many couples achieve their dreams of having a child. However, IVF is extremely expensive and/or inaccessible to many globally. In Central and Southern Africa "two-thirds of infertile women have diagnoses of tubal blockage attributable to sterilizing RTIs [Reproductive Tract Infections]" which is exactly what IVF was developed for. The high costs and inaccessibility keep infertility as a major aspect of stratified reproduction. According to a study done by Marcia C. Inhorn and Pasquale Patrizio, regions such as South Asia, sub-Saharan Africa, the Middle East and North Africa, Central and Eastern Europe and Central Asia have high infertility rates. While infertility is a global phenomenon, other issues within those regions play a role in their high infertility rates. Secondary infertility, being unable to conceive after a previous pregnancy, is the most common form of infertility in women. Typically secondary infertility comes from RTIs. In countries where abortions are illegal, women will choose to have unsafe abortions. These unsafe abortions can lead to RTIs and secondary infertility if left untreated. Studies show that in places where laws are lifting the ban on abortions, secondary infertility rates are decreasing.

Racial disparities and socioeconomic status also play a role in infertility as well as the reported use of medical services for infertility. Data from the National Survey of Fertility Growth (NSFG) showed that infertility rates for black (19.8 percent) and Hispanic women (18.2) were much higher than those rates for white women (6.9 percent).The same study revealed that although women of color experience higher infertility rates, they reported having not received medical services for infertility at higher rates than their white counterparts. Socioeconomic status also provides barriers for women who do not have the flexibility to take off work and schedule appointments that higher socioeconomic status women do. Without public or even insurance company funding for these ARTs, this suggest that those in a higher socioeconomic standing should be able to reproduce, while those who cannot afford these treatments should not have the same ability to do so. This notion is furthered by policies such as the welfare reform act of 1996 which denies benefits to children who are born to mothers on welfare. However, race and class disparities in infertility treatment remain even in states that have mandated infertility insurance coverage suggesting that the issue of stratified infertility options go beyond political policies.

=== Adoption ===
Adoption is another infertility option that hosts many barriers to underrepresented populations. Cost is one factor that is a barrier for people with a low SES status. There is also a devaluation of children of color within the adoption system. The demand for white children is higher than that for children of color, thus leading some adoption agencies to charge more to adopt white children. This practice suggests that white children are of higher value than children of color.

== Reproductive technologies and stratification ==
As there is a continual expansion of reproductive technologies, there is also increasing deficits in the access and utilization of these technologies due to stratified reproduction. Barriers achieving equal access to these reproductive technologies include high costs, lack of adequate healthcare or no healthcare, restrictive policies, lack of transportation and the lack of autonomy given to women to make their own reproductive decisions.

=== "Stratified Contraception" ===
Sheoran uses Shellee Colen's 'stratified reproduction' conceptual framing to propose that contraception is experienced hierarchically in places like India. Sheoran, when writing of Emergency Contraceptive Pills in India writes, 'ECPs in India thus make visible the reality of ‘stratified contraception,’ even as these technologies make inviting claims of eradicating stratification by providing all women with access to these pills at the local pharmacy'(pg. 250).

=== Sterilization ===
Sterilization is a relatively permanent form of contraception that can be used to give women reproductive control; however, this form of contraception has a history of blatant misuse. Sterilization was used to reinforce the social hierarchy where wealthy, white families were genetically superior to other groups of people. In this hierarchy, people of color, people with mental illnesses, criminals, those on welfare, single mothers and addicts were all seen as genetically inferiors; therefore justifying forced sterilization for the common good. The main target of forced sterilization were poor women of color.

In more recent history, there is still subtle and covert forms of coercion for certain groups to undergo sterilization. Sterilization rates still remain unequal between poor women of color and their white counterparts with Black and Native American women being twice as likely to have received a tubal sterilization. This data is found to be surprising taking into consideration that women of color are less likely to receive reproductive care or have health insurance to cover the costs of this procedure. A few explanations of this discrepancy is negative stereotypes of women of color as poor mothers and assuming women of color cannot afford children without being on welfare. These assumptions often lead to coercion and more invasive surgeries for reproductive issues that lead to sterilization. With women of color still at the forefront of this misuse of sterilization, the prison system has become a large target for coerced sterilizations. It was discovered that over 150 women were forcibly sterilized in prison between 2006 and 2010 because these women were deemed likely to return to prison. Even though sterilization was a costly procedure, physicians claimed that it would be better to pay for the procedure than pay for the welfare of these women's children.

== Racial implications ==
Ethnicity and race also play a role in stratified reproduction. Western media often focuses on the infertility of middle-class white women, to the detriment of poor and nonwhite women. Race and ethnicity are common tools used to justify reproductive injustices and health disparities seen throughout the United States.

=== Latino populations and stratified reproduction ===
Recent scholarship has investigated the history of conflict around Latinas and fertility in the United States. These stories provided evidence that the United States had funded forced sterilization of Latino people and other ethnic groups. In their article, Elena R. Gutiérrez and Liza Fuentes study two communities, Puerto Rican women in Puerto Rico and New York and Mexican-origin women in Los Angeles. Once Puerto Rico became an American colony in 1898, people began to talk about Puerto Rico being overpopulated. By 1965, over 34% of mothers aged 20–49 had been sterilized. Not all women chose to be sterilized. Many of these women were used for contraceptive testing without their knowledge. Mexican-origin women were another community that experienced forced sterilization. Some women were forced into nonconsensual sterilizations, including as they were giving birth. Scholar Leo Chavez argues that these sterilizations came from the idea that Latinos are over-populating the U.S.

In his article, Leo Chavez discusses Latino fertility in the United States. He writes that their presence promoted anti-immigration sentiment and advertising suggesting that they should leave the United States and that their fertility was not welcome in the country. Puerto Ricans, such as those discussed in the article by Gutiérrez and Fuentes, were a part of this larger Latino community that was being targeted. In Chavez's article, he collects data to discuss fertility rates among Latinas, showing that, though Latina women were more fertile than their non-Hispanic white counterparts, they had fewer lifetime sexual partners.

=== Black women experiencing stratified reproduction ===
Nearly one in four African-American women live below the poverty line, which greatly increases the risks associated with bearing children. Black women are two and a half times more likely to die during pregnancy, and their children are two times more likely to die as infants. Many attempt to view this issue as a biological issue of African-American women; however, black women residing in other countries have less reproductive complication than their American counterparts. Black women are less likely to be given medical advice, to be warned of possible medical complications, and to receive helpful prenatal therapies. This differential treatment from medical health professional leads to more birth complications, adverse birth outcomes and fetal death thus contributing to the system of stratified reproduction.

Residential segregation may indirectly harm health through harmful living environments and limited access to resources. Segregated communities often are characterized by more crime, greater pollution, higher population densities, more poverty, and fewer and lower-quality services, leading to infant mortality. This includes forms of environmental injustice, which incorporates the unfair plotting of landfill facilities and the deliberate targeting of minority and low-income communities as repositories for hazardous waste sites. Even though residential segregation affects various minority groups, in the United States there are stark health discrepancies between black woman and their white counterparts. Flint, Michigan is a predominately black area that exemplifies the harmful impact low environmental quality can have on healthy reproduction: The Flint water crisis decreased fertility rates by 12 percent and raised infant mortality by 58 percent among Flint residents.

== Queer stratified reproduction ==
More recently, there has been a closer look into how the system of stratified reproduction impacts the LGBTQ+ community. Stratified reproduction within the reproductive field of medicine feeds into a political economy that does not include a right to health, but a right to purchase health care if one can afford it and is deemed worthy of these biomedicines. States such as Arizona and Mississippi have recently seen legislative attempts to allow health care services to deny care to LGBTQ people; these stratifications of access to care also deny LGBTQ people the same possibilities for family planning and formation.
