= Accordion concerto =

Musical work for solo accordion and ensemble

An accordion concerto is a solo concerto for solo accordion and symphony orchestra or chamber orchestra.

== History ==
The accordion concerto has its origin in the twentieth century, following examples as the much older piano concerto or the violin concerto. The instrument accordion developed to a full concert instrument, more and more composers started composing for this instrument, also for accordion and orchestra.

In 1937 the first concerto for accordion and orchestra was written by Feodosiy Rubtsov (1904–1986) and performed by Pavel Gvozdev in the Hall of the Leningrad Philharmonic. In Germany one of the first concertos was written by Hugo Herrmann in 1940 (and a second one in 1948). In 1941 two American accordionists wrote and premiered concertos: Anthony Galla-Rini composed Concerto no. 1, Andy Arcari wrote his Concerto in D minor. Accordionist and Italian immigrant Pietro Deiro wrote a concerto in 1946, American composer Roy Harris composed his concerto (in the form of Theme and Variations) in 1947. Czech composer Emil František Burian wrote an accordion concerto already in 1949. In 1959 Czech composer Václav Trojan wrote "Pohádky" (fairy tales), which is still often played, in 2013 recorded by Ksenija Sidorova.

The first female accordion virtuoso to play an accordion concerto with accompaniment from a full symphony orchestra was Adeline Marie Mantino (later Rogillio), shortly following her graduation from the New England Conservatory of Music in 1950. The symphony was the Boston Philharmonic Orchestra. Miss Mantino went on to play with the New York Philharmonic Orchestra and the Boston Pops before settling into a career teaching music, first in Warren, RI and then Woonsocket, RI.

A very important accordionist for the development of the instrument was Mogens Ellegaard from Denmark. He worked together with the Danish composer Ole Schmidt. His composition Symphonic Fantasy and Allegro op. 20 from 1958 was a milestone. Other Scandinavian composers like Torbjörn Lundquist, Niels Viggo Bentzon (1963) and Per Nørgård (1968) followed. Arne Nordheim wrote his famous concerto "Spur" in 1975.

In the United States concertos were written by Alan Hovhaness (1959), Henry Cowell (Concerto Brevis, 1960), Carmelo Pino (Concertino, 1964), Paul Creston (1960 & 1964) en Carmine Coppola (1973). In 1962 French composer Jean Wiener wrote his concerto for accordion. In 1972 British composer Gordon Jacob wrote an accordion concerto.

In addition, several virtuoso instrumentalists adopted the classical concerto form in order to demonstrate the wide ranging orchestral sounds of the solo Free bass system instrument. Included in this group was the Italian-American John Serry Sr., who completed his Concerto for Free Bass Accordion in 1964 for the Bassetti Accordion as designed by Julio Giuliette.

Thanks to efforts of leading accordionists like Friedrich Lips, Joseph Macerollo, Geir Draugsvoll, Stefan Hussong, Mie Miki, Ksenija Sidorova and Teodoro Anzellotti the repertoire is growing to more than two hundred compositions. Famous composers like Sofia Gubaidulina, Jukka Tiensuu, Kalevi Aho, Giya Kancheli, Toshio Hosokawa, Jesús Torres, Fazil Say and Peter Machajdik wrote accordion concertos.

In 2016 Russian composer Sergei Slonimsky gave an accordion concerto to performers. (ISMN 979-0-3522-1064-6)

== Accordion concertos ==
- Feodosiy Rubtsov (1937)
- Hugo Herrmann (1940)
- Anthony Galla-Rini (1941)
- Pietro Deiro (1946)
- Roy Harris (1947, Theme and Variations)
- Hugo Herrmann (1948)
- Emil František Burian (1949)
- Alan Hovhaness (1959)
- Henry Cowell (1960, Concerto Brevis)
- Paul Creston (1960, Concerto for accordion and orchestra, Op. 75 )
- Nils Viggo Bentzon (1963)
- Carmelo Pino (1964)
- John Serry (1964, Concerto for Free Bass Accordion )
- Jean Wiener (1966)
- Charles Camilleri (1968)
- Gordon Jacob (1972)
- Carmine Coppola (1973)
- Arne Nordheim (1975, Spur).
- R. Murray Schafer (1992)
- Michael Easton (1996)
- Howard Skempton (1997, for oboe, accordion and strings)
- Edward McGuire (1999)
- Krzysztof Penderecki (2012)
- Luís Tinoco (2023)
- Mathilde Wantenaar (2024)
- Dobrinka Tabakova (2025)
- Fazil Say (2026)

== Sources ==
- C. Jacomucci (ed.): Critical selection of accordion works composed between 1990 and 2010. Loreto: Edizioni Tecnostampa, 2014. ISBN 978-88-87651-54-6.
- RIM Repertoire lists, volume 8 accordion, Utrecht 1990 (Repertoire Informatie Centrum)
- Draagbaar, meerstemmig, expressief. Het accordeon en zijn verwanten, Johan de With, uitgeverij KLANK, 2006. ISBN 90-8721-001-9
- Accordions.com
