= Accordion in music =

Musical form/genre

The accordion is in a wide variety of musical genres, mainly in traditional and popular music. In some regions, such as in Europe and North America, it has become mainly restricted to traditional, folk and ethnic music. Nonetheless, the button accordion (melodeon) and the piano accordion are widely taught and played in Ireland, and have remained a steady fixture within Irish traditional music, both in Ireland and abroad, particularly in the United States and Great Britain. Numerous virtuoso Irish accordion players have recorded many albums over the past century or so; the earliest Irish music records were made in the 1920s, in New York City, by fiddler and Sligo immigrant Michael Coleman, widely considered to have paved the way for other traditional musicians to record themselves. Accordions are also played within other Celtic styles (such as in Scotland, Cornwall and Brittany), as well as in English traditional music, American traditional music, polka, Galician folk music, and Eastern European folk music.

In northern Europe and Scandinavia, despite these musical traditions being somewhat fiddle-heavy, accordions may still be heard from time to time in the music of Denmark, Finland, Norway, Sweden and the Baltic states; the sound of accordion and fiddle played together has been said to be complementary.

In other regions, such as Mexico and Latin America, the instrument is very popular in genres like Norteño, Conjunto, and corridos; in Brazil, it is a fixture in popular music styles, such as Sertanejo and Forró.

The accordion is also used in Western art music, such as jazz (most famously the North American accordionist Frank Marocco) and classical music.

== Use in traditional music ==
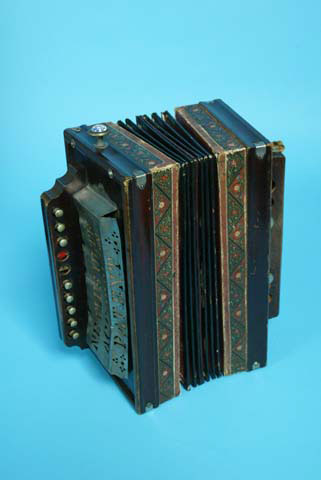
A 19th-century accordion, in the collection of The Children's Museum of Indianapolis

After the invention of the accordion in 1829, its popularity spread throughout the world, in no small measure due to the polka craze. "Once the polka became a craze in Paris and London during the spring of 1844, it diffused rapidly to the rest of the world. . . . In March 1844, polka-mania took Paris: common people, servants, workers and, one assumes, anyone else who wasn't too stuffy were dancing the polka in the streets of the capital and soon in Bordeaux and other French cities as well. A week or so later it took London by storm. And from these two great centers of fashion, empire, and influence, the polka diffused rapidly upward into the rest of French and English society and outward to the rest of the world."

Except for a brief moment in time during the 1830s and 1840s when the accordion was heard by French aristocracy during Salon music concerts, the instrument has always been associated with the common people. The accordion was spread across the globe by the waves of Europeans who emigrated to various parts of the world in the late 19th century and early 20th century.

The mid-19th-century accordion became a favorite of folk musicians for several reasons: "The new instrument's popularity [among the common masses] was a result of its unique qualities. Firstly, it was much louder than all the older folk instruments put together. It could easily be heard in even the wildest pub above the stomping of dancing feet. It was also the prototype of a 'one man band' with bass and chords on the left-hand side and buttons for the melody on the right, and you could still sing along and beat the rhythm with your feet. The instrument needed no tuning and was always ready to play, but the most ingenious thing about the early one-row squeezebox was that you couldn't play it really badly. Even if you lost the melody it still sounded fine."

Since its invention, the accordion has become popularly integrated into a lot of varying traditional music styles all over the world, ranging from the European polka and the Colombian Vallenato to Korean trot music. See the list of traditional music styles that incorporate the accordion. Although rarely seen, some early swing band scores have the piano part marked "Piano/Piano Accordion."

It is a traditional instrument in Brazilian music, specifically baião of the northeast. Luiz Gonzaga is called the king of baião.

The accordion is featured heavily in traditional Egyptian music, particularly baladi styles.

Sometimes, certain traditional music styles may even be tied to a certain type of accordion, like the Schrammel accordion for Schrammelmusik, the Trikitixa for Basque music, or the diatonic button accordion in Mexican conjunto and norteño music. It would be hard to name one country in which the accordion did not play a significant role in its music tradition. It has even been idealized in literature.

== Use in popular music ==
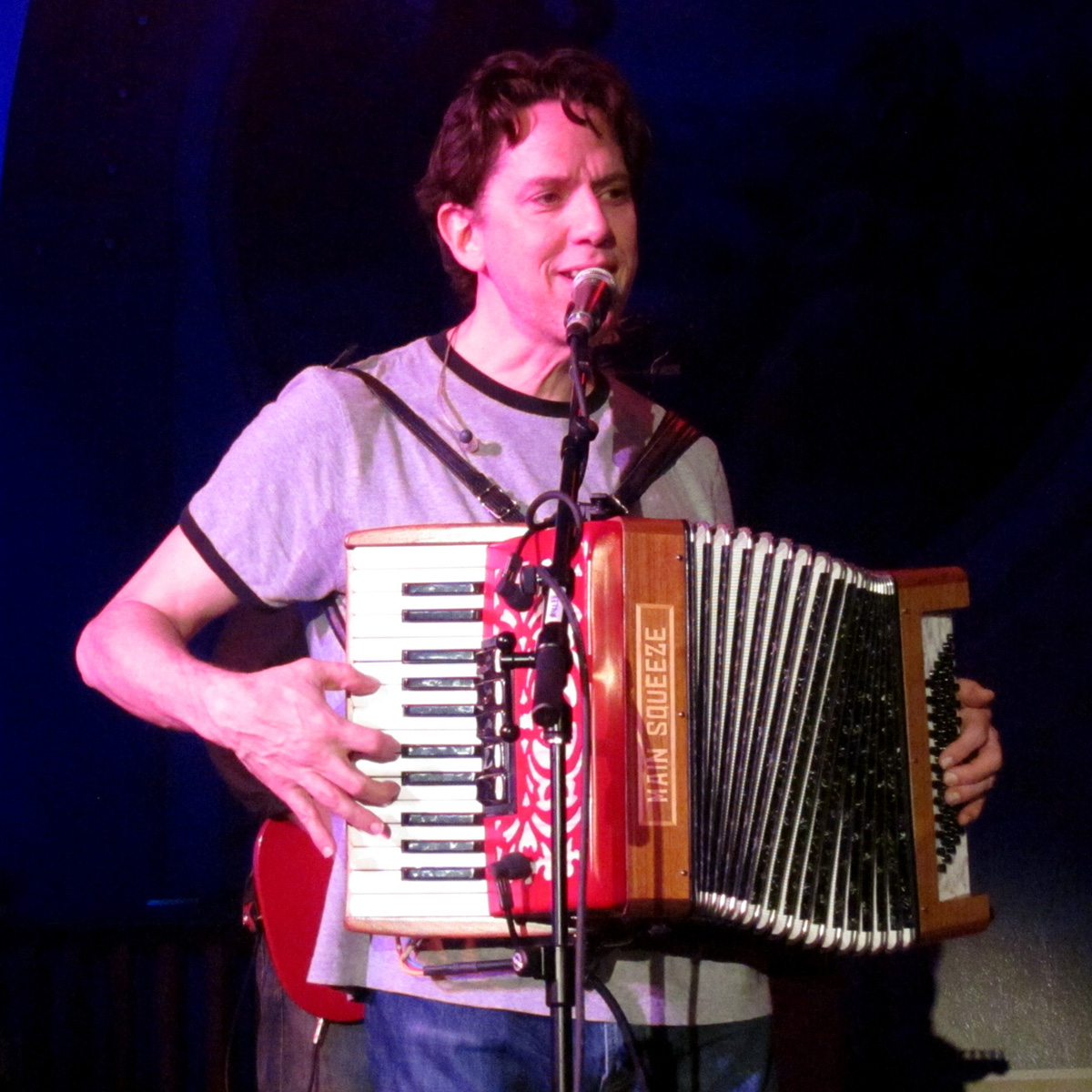
John Linnell of They Might Be Giants playing a Main Squeeze 911

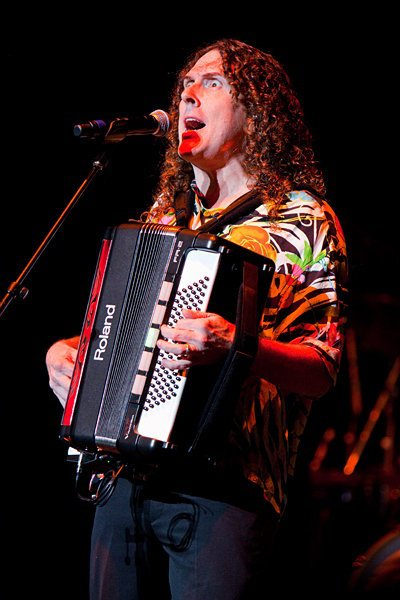
"Weird Al" Yankovic playing a Roland FR-7 V-Accordion

The accordion was heard frequently in popular music beginning around 1910 until about 1960. With rise of the popularity of the guitar (in particular the electric guitar) and rock music, the popularity of the accordion in pop music in Europe and North-America declined strongly. In some countries however, such as Brazil and Mexico, the accordion continues to be a fixture in pop music and its popularity is undiminished.

This half century is often called the "Golden Age of the Accordion." Three players, more than any others, inaugurated this era of popularity for the instrument, all Italian immigrants to the United States: Pietro Frosini, and the two brothers Count Guido Deiro and Pietro Deiro. All three players were celebrities on the Vaudeville circuits and performed throughout North America, Europe and Australia during the age of Vaudeville. They recorded hundreds of 78 RPM records for the Victor Talking Machine Company, Columbia Records, Decca Records, Edison Records and Cylinders, and other labels. Guido Deiro was the most successful and famous accordionist during the 1910s and 1920s, and lived a life filled with celebrity, luxury, fast cars, and fast women. Many popular bands, such as the Paul Whiteman Orchestra, employed staff accordionists.

After most Vaudeville theaters closed during the Great Depression, accordionists still found work during the 1930s teaching and performing for radio. Charles Magnante is considered one of the greatest American popular accordionists. At the peak of his career, he played 30 live radio broadcasts and eight studio sessions each week. Another great popular American accordionist was Dick Contino, who toured with the Horace Heidt Orchestra and was billed as the "world's greatest accordion player." He appeared on The Ed Sullivan Show a record 48 times. In addition, John Serry, Sr. achieved national recognition on tour with Shep Fields and His Rippling Rhythm jazz orchestra during the 1930s, concertized on the CBS radio and television networks in the 1940s and 1950s and appeared in the Broadway Theatre during the 1950s and 1960s.

During the 1950s through the 1980s the accordion received great exposure on television with performances by Myron Floren—the accordionist with Lawrence Welk—on the Lawrence Welk Show. However, with the advent of rock 'n roll and the generation gap in the late 1950s and early 1960s, the accordion declined in popularity, as the younger generation considered it "square"— epitomizing the light-hearted music of their parents and grandparents. In the United States, it has often been thought of as a "European instrument," despite the accordion having a presence in American music ever since its creation. Because of this, the accordion has often been the subject of "dumb Euro" stereotypes (portraying Central and Eastern European people as goofy or unintelligent), although modern performers are working to change that stereotype.

In Europe and North American (outside of Mexico), in contemporary mainstream pop music, the use of the accordion is usually considered exotic or old-fashioned. Nevertheless, some popular acts do use the instrument in their distinctive sounds, and a 2014 Los Angeles Times article reports that the instrument is growing in popularity locally. (See the list of popular music acts that incorporate the accordion.) Since the late 19th century, Tejano music has emerged as one of the leading genres for the instrument in America. Pioneers such as Narciso Martínez gave the instrument staple in the cultural music of Mexican American people. Central to the evolution of early Tejano music was the blend of traditional forms such as the Corrido and Mariachi, and Continental European styles, such as Polka, introduced by German and Czech settlers in the late 19th century. In particular, the accordion was adopted by Tejano folk musicians at the turn of the 20th century, and it became a popular instrument for amateur musicians in Texas and Northern Mexico.

External videos
- The Library of Congress-Benjamin Botkin Lecture Series; Squeeze This! A Cultural History of the Accordion in America by Marion S. Jacobson (2012)

The accordion is popular among folk punk and folk rock bands who perform music from countries that often use the accordion, such as in the subgenres of celtic punk and gypsy punk. Such bands include The Dreadnoughts, Gogol Bordello, the Zydepunks, and Flogging Molly.

The accordion has been a primary instrument in Mexican music. It is mostly associated with Norteño music, which has become one of the most popular music genres in Mexico since the 1990s, but the instrument is also featured in other genres such as Cumbia. Ramón Ayala is arguably the best-known accordion player in Mexico; nicknamed the "King of the accordion", Ayala has recorded over 113 albums since the 1960s.

Additionally, the accordion became a fixture in merengue music, a genre that is representative of the Dominican Republic.

In some countries, such as Brazil, the accordion is a fixture in mainstream popular music (evidenced by mainstream groups such as Falamansa, Michel Teló, Avioes do Forró). The instrument is commonly learned by teenagers and enjoys a popularity comparable to the guitar. In some regions (such as the North-East, where it is called sanfona), the accordion surpasses the guitar in popularity among the youth. In Brazil, however, the accordion uses normally a very dry tuning, which dissociates it from the wetter sound found in European folk music.

The instrument was also used in the Disney song "Whale of a Tale" from 20,000 Leagues Under the Sea, as well as Donald Duck's song, "Quack Quack Quack". It was used in a Christmas setting for the song "Nuttin' for Christmas".

The composer Tomohito Nishiura frequently uses the accordion in the Professor Layton series of games, for example in "Laboratory" or "Don Paolo's Theme". However, when 'Live Versions' of the soundtracks are released, the accordion is occasionally replaced (such as in "London 3" from Professor Layton and the Unwound Future). Every 'theme' for a game uses the accordion in some capacity.

Various folk metal and viking metal bands, such as Finsterforst, Finntroll, and Turisas that have formed in the 1990s and first decade of the 21st century feature accordions.

== Use in classical music ==
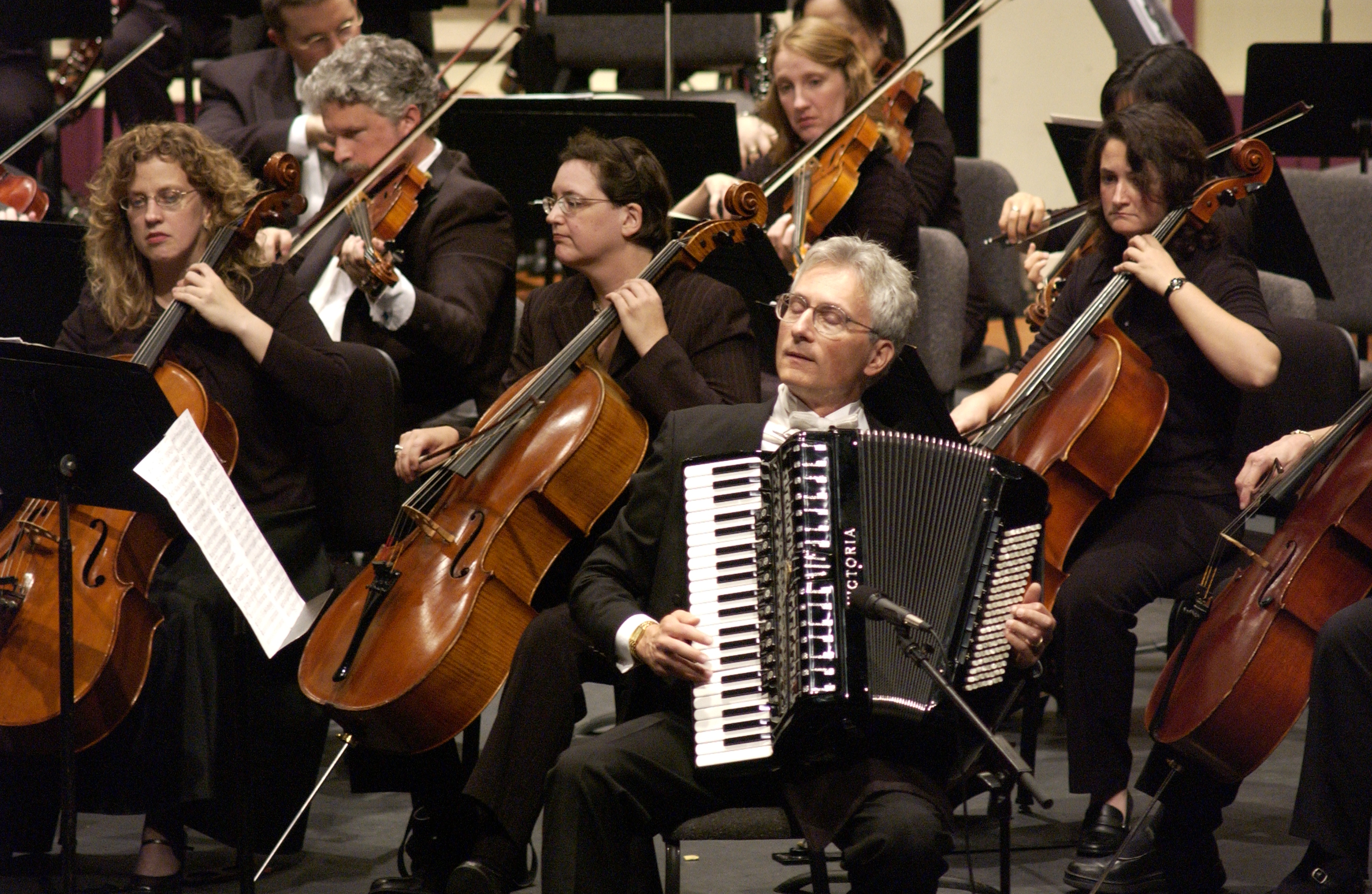
Henry Doktorski with the New Philharmonic Orchestra.

Although the accordion is best known primarily as a folk instrument, it has been used with increasing frequency by classical composers. The earliest surviving concert piece written for the accordion is Thême varié très brillant pour accordéon methode Reisner, written in 1836 by Miss Louise Reisner of Paris, an accordionist and amateur composer.

The Russian composer Piotr Ilyitch Tchaikovsky included four optional single-action diatonic accordions in his Orchestral Suite No. 2 in C Major, op. 53 (1883), simply to add a little color to the third movement: Scherzo burlesque.

The Italian composer Umberto Giordano included the single-action diatonic accordion in his opera Fedora (1898). The accordionist appears on-stage—along with a folk-trio consisting of a piccolo player and triangle player—three times in the third act (which is set in Switzerland), to accompany a short and simple song which is sung by a little Savoyard (Alpine shepherd).

In 1915, the American composer Charles Ives included a chorus of diatonic accordions (or concertinas (Note: The orchestra score ambiguously lists the part sometimes as "accordions" and sometimes as "concertinas."))—along with two pianos, celesta, harp, organ, zither and an optional theremin—in his Orchestral Set No. 2. The accordion part—written for the right-hand only—consists of eighteen measures at the very end of the eighteen-minute-long three-movement work. All the above works were written for the diatonic button accordion.

The first composer to write specifically for the chromatic accordion (able to play all 12 notes of the chromatic scale) was Paul Hindemith. In 1921 he included the harmonium in Kammermusik No. 1, a chamber work in four movements for twelve players, but later rewrote the harmonium part for accordion. Other German composers also wrote for the accordion.

In 1922, Austrian composer Alban Berg included a short on-stage accordion part in his landmark opera Wozzeck, Op. 7. The instrument—marked Ziehharmonika bzw. Akkordeon in the score appears only during the tavern garden (wirthausgarten) scene, along with an on-stage (Bühnenmusik) ensemble consisting of two fiddles (violins tuned up a tone), one clarinet in C, one guitar and one bombardon in F (or bass tuba), to lend a touch of authenticity to the deutsche Biergarten setting. In 1937 the first accordion concerto was written and played in Russia.

In the halls of academe, the American concert accordionist Robert Davine played a central role in establishing one of the few major academic courses of study in Accordion Performance within the United States during the late 1950s. As the founder and Dean of the University of Denver's Lamont School of Music's Department of Accordion, Davine influenced generations of students both in the United States and the People's Republic of China where he taught Master Classes. In addition to composing a Divertimento for Flute, Clarinet and Accordion, Davine is credited with concertizing and recording extensively within a variety of classical orchestral ensembles including: symphonic orchestras, chamber orchestras as well as string quartets. (Note: Various classical music scores for accordion as compiled by Robert Davine can be accessed within the "Robert Davine Classical Accordion Music and Long Play Album Collection" - University of Denver Archive)

During the 1960s, the American Accordionists Association (AAA) commissioned the Italian American composer Nicolas Flagello to compose an Introduction and Scherzo (1964) for solo accordion. After noting that, "some composers think they are above writing for the accordion" Flagello was eager to create a work which would demonstrate "the virtuosity of the instrument just as all other music has been written for all the other instruments in the past." He assured the association that he was eager to write his "best music" for the young instrument and completed an "athletic" composition which he described as, "a very difficult piece." His work is divided into two sections: a brooding Introduction (Quasi Largo, ma andante) consisting of thirty-seven measures followed by a waltz-like Scherzo (Allegro, ma incominicando lento) consisting of ninety-eight measures in the key of E minor and 6/8 meter. It has been described as a well crafted composition which is characterized by an, "unrelenting violent, melodramatic, bombastic nature and dissonant but standard extended terian harmonies." During the 1960s it became a standard in the repertoire of many aspiring accordion virtuosos enrolled in regional competitions sponsored by the AAA.

=== Free-bass accordion in classical music ===
Despite efforts by accordion performers and organizations to present the accordion as a serious instrument to the classical music world, the much-coveted breakthrough into the mainstream of serious musical circles did not take place until after leading accordionists more or less abandoned the stradella-bass accordion (an instrument limited to only bass and pre-set chord buttons on the left-hand manual) and embraced the free-bass accordion (an instrument which could play single pitches on the left-hand manual with a range of three octaves or more, similar to the right-hand manual). Composers found the free-bass accordion much more attractive and easier to write for as it liberated the instrument from a limited range of bass notes (only a major seventh, C to B) and the pre-set chord buttons. (Note: Both Hindemith and Berg wrote for the free-bass accordion in 1922.)

Despite being invented as early as 1912, the instrument did not really become popular until the mid-20th century, when it was "discovered" by classical accordionists. The Danish accordionist Mogens Ellegaard, regarded by many as the father of the avant-garde accordion movement, described his introduction to the new accordion:

"When I started, there was absolutely no accordion culture. Unless, you define accordion culture as 'oom-pah-pah,' or the Cuckoo Waltz—that sort of thing. The free-bass accordion didn't exist—it was entirely unknown when I was a child. At that time the accordion world was living in splendid isolation. No contact at all with the outside musical world.

He said they heard shows with "Frosini, Deiro repertoire or folkloristic music." However, he found it was not possible to get a good education on accordion, as accordionists were not accepted at major music schools. The best soloists could hope for was playing at nightclubs on weekends.

Ellegaard continued,

"But in 1953 the first free-bass accordions were introduced in Denmark and, by coincidence, I was one of the first students to get such an instrument. . . . In 1957, the pianist Vilfred Kjaer... organize[d] the world premiere of Jubilesse infameuse.

Composer Ole Schmidt liked the instrument and in 1958 he composed a Symphonic Fantasy and Allegro, op. 20 for accordion and orchestra."

Symphonic Fantasy and Allegro was premiered by the Danish Radio Symphony with the composer conducting. Ole Schmidt made the following comment about the work, "I hated accordion until I met Mogens Ellegaard. He made me decide to write an accordion concerto for him."

Other Danish composers soon followed Schmidt: (Note: For compositions particularly written for Ellegaard, see contents of the "Mogens Ellegaard collection" that are listed at The Royal Library of Denmark (Danish), also listing compositions written for him and their author.)

- Niels Viggo Bentzon wrote Concerto for Accordion (1962–63), In the Zoo (1964) and Sinfonia concertante (1965) for six accordions, string orchestra and percussion.
- Per Nørgård wrote Anatomic Safari (1967) for solo accordion and Recall (1968) for accordion and orchestra, which was dedicated to Lars Dyremose, director of the Danish Accordion Academy.
- Karl Aage Rasmussen wrote Invention (1972)
- Hans Abrahamsen wrote Canzone (1977-8) for solo accordion.
- Steen Pade, Nørgård's student, wrote a concerto for accordion and three solo works: Excursions With Detours (1984), Aprilis (1987) and Cadenza (1987).
- Vagn Holmboe wrote Sonata, Op. 143A.

In Europe, free bass accordion performance has reached a very high level and the instrument is considered worthy of serious study in music conservatories. Modern and avant-garde composers such as Sofia Gubaidulina, Edison Denisov, Luciano Berio, Per Nørgård, Arne Nordheim, Jindrich Feld, Franco Donatoni, Toshio Hosokawa, Mauricio Kagel, Patrick Nunn and Magnus Lindberg have written for the free bass accordion and the instrument is becoming more frequently integrated into new music chamber and improvisation groups.

The Italian composer Salvatore Sciarrino (b. 1947) recently wrote a piece entitled Storie di Altre Storie, for accordionist Teodoro Anzellotti, requiring use of the free bass accordion in its instrumentation, and drawing off the keyboard sonatas of Domenico Scarlatti, the glass harmonica music of Wolfgang Amadeus Mozart, and the ballades of Guillaume de Machaut. It was well received by most European audiences and was released on a compilation disc of Sciarrino's other works on the Winter and Winter label. Young generation composers who have written for accordion include Christina Athinodorou (b. 1981) who wrote "Virgules" for Solo Accordion (2009) featuring the combined use between the stradella bass and the chromatic button system.

In the United States, the free-bass accordion is heard occasionally. Beginning in the 1960s, competitive performance on the accordion of classical piano compositions, by the great masters of music, occurred. Although never mainstreamed in the larger musical scene, this convergence with traditional classical music propelled young accordionists to an ultimate involvement with classical music heretofore not experienced.

A number of American instrumentalists did succeed in demonstrating the unique orchestral capabilities of the free bass accordion while performing at the nation's premier concert venues. In the process they encouraged contemporary composers to write for the instrument. Included among the leading orchestral artists was John Serry, Sr. A concert accordionist, soloist, composer, and arranger, Serry performed extensively in both symphonic orchestras and jazz ensembles as well as on live radio and television broadcasts. His refined poetic artistry gained respect for the free bass accordion as a serious concert instrument among prominent classical musicians and conductors of the early 20th century. In addition, his Concerto For Free Bass Accordion was completed in 1966 and illustrates the vast orchestral potentialities of the instrument. (Note: For classical compositions & arrangements for the Giulletti Bassetti Accordion and the Stradella Accordion by John Serry see the contents of the "John J. Serry Sr Collection" that are listed at The Eastman School of Music - Sibley Music Library : Ruth T. Watanabe Special Collections)

Recently Guy Klucevsek has built a reputation on combining folk styles with classical forms and makes extensive use of the free bass. New York's William Schimmel, who composes and performs in many genres, is a leading exponent of the "quint" style free bass system and uses it extensively in tandem with the standard stradella system. Nick Ariondo, Los Angeles based accordionist/composer, has created a large repertoire for both free bass and standard stradella systems, performing throughout his career with vocalists, in solo recitals, chamber music settings and with orchestra. Opposite the Titano Accordion "quint" free bass system designed by Willard Palmer, Ariondo and the late Tommy Gumina are two artists in the United States that play a reverse "quint" free bass system (no converter, only free bass). Ariondo's "Perpetual Motion" (Paganini) video demonstrates the artistic capabilities of the free bass accordion .

In Canada several performers also contributed extensively to the acceptance of the Free Bass Accordion as a respected member of orchestral ensembles throughout North America. Among the leading performers, educators and composers is Joseph Macerollo who has achieved widespread acclaim as an interpreter of both contemporary and classical compositions for the instrument.

Other notable classical accordion performers include Pauline Oliveros, Owen Murray and Rob Reich of the Tin Hat Trio.

=== Notable works for accordion: 20th century ===
- Virgil Thomson: Four Saints in Three Acts (1928)
- Sergei Prokofiev: Cantata for the 20th Anniversary of the October Revolution, op. 74 (1936)
- Paul Dessau: Mother Courage (1936) and Die Verurteilung des Lukullus (1949)
- Dmitri Shostakovich: Jazz Suite No. 2 (1938)
- Jean Françaix: Apocalypse According to St. John (1939)
- Darius Milhaud: Prelude and Postlude for "Lidoire" (1946)
- Roy Harris: Theme and Variations for accordion and orchestra (1947)
- Henry Brant: All Soul's Carnival (1949)
- George Antheil—of Ballet mécanique fame: Accordion Dance for accordion and orchestra (1951)
- John Serry, Sr.: American Rhapsody (1955), to name a few.
- Paul Creston: Accordion Concerto, op.75 (1958)
- Ole Schmidt: Symphonic Fantasy and Allegro (1958)
- Alan Hovhaness: Accordion Concerto, op. 174 (1959)
- Václav Trojan: Fairy Tales, 1959
- Henry Cowell: Concerto Brevis for accordion and orchestra (1960)
- Nils Viggo Bentzon: Accordion Concerto (1963)
- Jean Wiener: Accordion Concerto (1966)
- Charles Camilleri: Accordion Concerto (1968)
- Per Nørgård: Recall (1968)
- Gordon Jacob: Concerto for Chromatic Accordion, String Orchestra & Percussion (1972)
- Pauline Oliveros: Horse Sings from Cloud (1975)
- Eric Salzman: Accord (1975)
- Sofia Gubaidulina: Et Exspecto for solo accordion (1985)
- Robert Rodriguez: Tango (1985)
- R. Murray Schafer: Accordion Concerto (1992)
- Lyell Cresswell: Dragspil, (1994)
- Luciano Berio: Sequenza XIII (1995)
- Howard Skempton: Concerto for oboe, accordion and strings (1997)
- Edward McGuire: Concerto for Accordion (1999)

=== Notable works for accordion: 21st century ===
- Erkki-Sven Tüür: Prophecy (2007)
- Sally Beamish: The Singing (2011)
- Ben Lunn: Mandala (2012)
- Krzysztof Penderecki: Accordion Concerto (2012)
- Brett Dean: The Players (2019)
- Jonathan Dove: Northern Lights (2019)
- Aileen Sweeney: Winter (2021)
- Luís Tinoco: Accordion Concerto (2023)
- Jay Capperauld: Galvanic Dances (2025)
- Dobrinka Tabakova: Accordion Concerto (2025)

=== The Accordion Orchestra in classical music ===
In the early twentieth century the Hohner corporation also assumed an important role in the evolution of the accordion from a folk instrument which was primarily performed by ear into a "legitimate" orchestral instrument which could be accepted on the concert hall stage. In the early 1900s this German manufacturer of musical instruments formed an accordion orchestra consisting entirely of thirty musicians who successfully toured throughout the nation while performing classical music. In addition, an accordion college was established in order to facilitate the development of professional educators who specialized in the performance of the instrument.

Ironically, the founding of The Hohner Symphony Accordion Orchestra in Trossingen, Germany in 1931 was somewhat problematic since it also coincided with the emergence of the Nazi party prior to World War II. As the political winds shifted in Germany during the 1930s, musicians appearing in accordion orchestras suddenly encountered objections from members of the Third Reich's official institute of music, the Reichsmussikkammer. Performances of traditional classical music on the accordion were now deemed to constituted an "affront" to the memory of prominent German composers from the past. Concert performances on the accordion remained popular with the German public however and Germany's soldiers even embraced the instrument on the battlefield. Further attempts by Nazi government officials to ban the instrument entirely were subsequently never enforced after the Hohner company argued that the accordion was in fact a "legitimate" German folk instrument.

The accordion orchestra was resurrected within the framework of an even larger ensemble within the United States in the post World War II era during the 1940s. Unlike its smaller cousin the accordion band, this iteration of a purely free-reed symphonic ensemble typically utilized between fifty and one hundred musicians who specialized in the performance of classical and popular musical selections as opposed to a lighter musical repertoire. Leading ensembles developed in several American cultural centers and included: the New York Accordion Symphony in New York City, the Springfield Accordion Orchestra in Massachusetts, the Duluth Accordionaires in Minnesota, the Philadelphia Accordion Orchestra in Pennsylvania (PAO) and the Houston Accordion Symphony in Texas (also known as the Palmer-Hughes Accordion Symphony).

In the United States, such symphonic accordion orchestras often performed under the baton of prominent soloists including Jacob C. Neupauer and Joseph Biviano. Neupauer conducted his PAO accordion orchestra in concert versions of selections from several operas including: Bedtrich Smetena's The Bartered Bride and Giuseppe Verdi's La Traviata at the Philadelphia Academy of Music during the late 1950s Joseph Biviano also played an important role in the early development of the symphonic accordion orchestra in the United States and has been described as a "father" to the symphonic accordion movement in America. In 1960 he experimented even further by collaborating with leading accordionists such as Carmen Carrozza, Angelo Di Pippo, Eugene Ettore and John Serry in an early stereo recording by a leading accordion orchestra for Coral Records (Pietro Deiro Presents the Accordion Orchestra, #CRL-57323) which included musical selections by such classical composers as: Nikolai Rimsky-Korsakov, Carl Maria von Weber, Nicolo Paganini and Pyotr Ilyich Tchaikovsky.
