= Franko Božac =

- Also known as: Franco Bozac
- Born: 3 November 1974 (age 50)
- Origin: Pula, Croatia
- Genres: Classical
- Occupation(s): Performer, Educator
- Instrument(s): Bayan, Classical accordion

Franko Božac (born 3 November 1974 in Croatia) is a classical accordion performer.

== Biography ==
Božac’s has performed in theatres in several countries, including the Queen Elizabeth Hall (London), Liverpool Philharmonic Hall, Cornerstone – Hope at Everton, Cosmo Rodelwald Concert Hall, Duke’s Hall, Oxford Playhouse, Nottingham Playhouse, City University London, and Henry Wood Hall. Recently, he has performed The Rage of Jaques Brell with Antony Cable and Stuart Barr at The New End Theatre in London. He has also performed at festivals such as the Cornerstone Festival in Liverpool, London Virtuoso Festival, International Music Forums, Bloomsbury Festival, Histria Festival, Zetra Festival.

He has premiered numerous concertos for the button accordion. The most recent was The Hall of Horcum (Concerto for accordion and orchestra, which was written and dedicated to him) by British composer James Williamson. The premiere was held at the Duke's Hall of The Royal Academy of Music in London, and he was accompanied by the Royal Academy of Music Symphony Orchestra, conducted by renowned conductor Patrick Bailey. Another important accordion premiere was the performance of the Introduction, Choral and Final for accordion and orchestra, (which is also dedicated to him), composed by the Russian composer Alexander A. Attarov. Other premieres include: Paraphrase for accordion and strings orchestra composed by Branko Okmaca, Aproksimato no. 2 and Zujalica composed by Bashkim Shehu (scored for bayan and symphony orchestra). With 10/10 Ensemble (Chamber Orchestra – part of the Royal Liverpool Philharmonic Orchestra), he recorded for BBC Radio 3 the works of contemporary British composer Gary Carpenter. Besides this, he has recorded a project for BBC Scotland, the St Kilda Opera Hiort, which was conducted simultaneously in Britain, France, Belgium, Austria and Germany. The work is scored for five instruments, three choirs and soloists.

Božac has also collaborated with The London Sinfonietta (under the direction of composer and conductor, George Benjamin), Royal Liverpool Philharmonic Orchestra, University of Manchester Symphony Orchestra, Croatian Chamber Philharmonic Orchestra, University “Juraj Dobrila” Symphonic Orchestra and Royal College of Music Symphony Orchestra.

Božac graduated from the University of Pula, Croatia and was the first accordion graduate at the time in his native land (Croatia). He later graduated with a Master's degree from Ino Mirkovich Music Academy under licence of Moscow State Conservatory P.I. Tchaikovsky in Lovran, under the tuition of Prof. Volodimir Balyk, followed by a postgraduate diploma from the Royal Academy of Music- London, in the class of Prof Owen Murray. He is currently an accordion professor at the University of Pula. His students have until now won over 80 prizes in national and international competitions, including: The Trophée Mondial de l’Accordéon, Coupe Mondiale, state and country competitions.

He is a member of the Croatian society of musical artists, the Croatian Music Union and The Croatian Accordion Society. He has conduct masterclasses and seminars in Croatia and the neighbouring countries. In 2009, the Education Ministry of Croatia awarded Božac a medal for outstanding musical achievements.
