= American Rhapsody =

Jazz composition by John Serry

American Rahpsody
- Rhapsody by John Serry Sr.
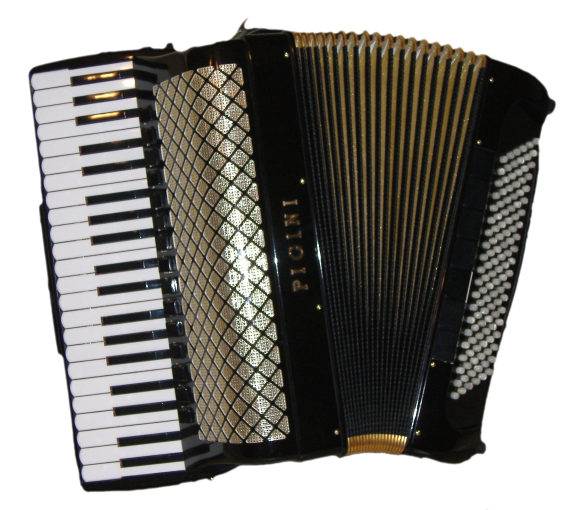
- Key: B-flat major
- Year: 1955 for Stradella accordion 1963 transcription free-bass accordion 2002 transcription for piano
- Genre: Symphonic jazz
- Form: Free-bass accordion solo
- Composed: 1955–1955: Long Island
- Performed: 1963: Long Island
- Published: 1957: New York
- Publisher: Alpha Music Company
- Movements: Four
- Scoring: Free-bass accordion

Premiere
- Date: 1963
- Location: New York City
- Performers: John Serry Sr.

American Rhapsody was written for the accordion by John Serry Sr. in 1955 and subsequently transcribed for the free-bass accordion in 1963 and for the piano in 2002. The composer was inspired by the classical orchestral works of George Gershwin along with various Latin jazz percussive rhythms utilized throughout South America while composing this opus (see Rhapsody in Blue).

== Composition ==
By synthesizing compositional techniques typically associated with classical music with those identified with jazz, this piece serves as an example of the symphonic jazz genre featuring the stradella bass system accordion as a solo instrument. Its revised edition for free-bass accordion is noteworthy in its attempt to illustrate the versatility of the instrument. In addition, it pays homage to the music of South America by incorporating a clear Latin American beat in the Dance sequence.

During the "Golden Age of the Accordion" (1910-1960), the accordion was rarely seen or heard in "serious" classical music concerts. In addition, composers such as Tchaikovsky, Giordano, Ives and Hindemith typically incorporated the instrument into their compositions solely in an effort to create a comic or pastoral effect. This work is therefore noteworthy in so far as it represents an effort on the part of a known musician who specialized on the accordion to compose for an instrument for which relatively few classical works were completed at the start of the 20th century in America (See Accordion Use in Classical music, Accordion music genres & List of jazz-influenced classical compositions). (Note: For classical compositions & arrangements for the Giulletti Bassetti Accordion and the Stradella Accordion by John Serry see the contents of the "John J. Serry Sr Collection" that are listed at The Eastman School of Music - Sibley Music Library : Ruth T. Watanabe Special Collections)

The composition was published in its original version for the solo Stradella bass system piano accordion by the Alpha Music Company in 1957. It was performed on the piano accordion by the composer for the Atlas Accordion Corporation at the Music Trades Convention in New York City in 1959. The work was also premiered by the composer on the free-bass accordion in a concert series hosted by the Orpheus Glee Club at Flushing, New York, in December, 1963. It was subsequently performed by a student of the composer (Joseph Nappi) for the first annual concert of the Accordion Association of Long Island during 1964 in New York. It was eventually transcribed by the composer for solo piano in 2002 and is described in its revised version for piano. Copies of the work have been donated for the benefit of researchers and students at the Eastman School of Music's Sibley Music Library for archival purposes within the Ruth T. Watanabe Special Collections Department as part of the John J. Serry Sr. Collection.

== Sections ==
The composition consists of four parts:

- Part I – "Introduction and Blues" (Maestoso)
- Part II – "The Dance" (Allegretto ben ritmato)
- Part III – "The Dream" (Andante Sostenuto)
- Part IV – "Finale: The Awakening" (Vivace)

=== Part I. Introduction and Blues ===
The opening Introduction and Blues is scored in 3/4 time in the key of B♭ and is marked Maestoso. The opening chord flourish is boldly presented as octaves within the treble voice and immediately echoed in the bass voice several times. This is followed by "The Blues", which is scored in 2/4 time in the same key as the introduction but is marked Andantino.

The main theme is now developed (E Poco Robato) in both the bass and treble voices. The ensuing inter-leaving of both voices leads to a sustained trill and arpeggio marked A Piacore and subsequently recapitulated alone in the bass voice. This is followed by a series of chromatic chord modulations from the key of D♯ leading back to B♭. The section concludes with a cascade of eighth notes presented as an overlay to the echoes of the main theme repeated in the bass.

=== Part II. The Dance ===
The second section of the composition is a dance scored in 4/4 time in the key of D major and is marked Allegretto ben ritmato with bougoes or maracas). The section opens with a melodic line in the bass which is syncopated with development in the treble voice. This culminates in a brief cadenza in the key of F and the onset of a dissonance for the climax. A series of sixteenth note flourishes ensues in the treble voice. This is followed by a series of chord modulations marked Furioso which heralds the onset of the "Dream" sequence.

=== Part III. The Dream ===
The third section is entitled "The Dream" and is scored in 4/4 time in the key of C major marked Andante sostenuto. It embodies a recapitulation of the main theme which is marker Molto Legato. The recapitulation is accompanied by a key change back to F major. It concludes with the theme expressed dominantly in octaves and a recapitulation leading to the key of C major which is marked Allegretti scherzando.

=== Part IV. Finale: The Awakening ===
The final section is entitled "The Awakening" and is initially scored in the key of C major marked Vivace. It is a section which opens with a series of sixteenth note flourishes leading back to the key of B♭. Here the main theme of The Dance sequence is restated and culminates in a final arpeggio rumbling though the bass.

== Archived score and recording ==
The John J. Serry Sr. Collection at the Eastman School of Music- Sibley Music Library: Ruth T. Watanabe Special Collections contains:

- A copy of the published score to American Rhapsody for solo accordion (1955, Alpha Music Co.)
- A revised transcription of American Rhapsody for solo piano (1985)
- A recording of American Rhapsody by John Serry on accordion (circa 1960s)
