= Chromatic button accordion =

Musical instrument

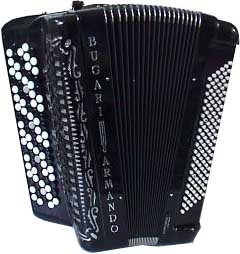
- Classification: Free-reed aerophone

Playing range
- Right-hand manual: The Russian bayan and chromatic button accordions have a much greater right-hand range in scientific pitch notation than an accordion with a piano keyboard: five octaves plus a minor third (written range = E2-G7, actual range = E1-D9, some have a 32 ft Register on the Treble to go even lower down to E0. Left-hand manual: Stradella bass system; Free-bass system

Musicians
- List of accordionists

More articles or information
- Accordion, Chromatic button accordion, Bayan, Diatonic button accordion, Piano accordion, Stradella bass system, Free-bass system, Accordion reed ranks and switches

A chromatic button accordion (CBA) is a type of button accordion where the melody-side keyboard consists of rows of buttons arranged chromatically.

== Playing ==
The bass-side keyboard is usually the Stradella system or one of the various free-bass systems. Included among chromatic button accordions are the Russian bayan and Schrammel accordion. There can be 3 to 5 rows of vertical treble buttons. In a 5 row chromatic, two additional rows repeat the first 2 rows to facilitate options in fingering.

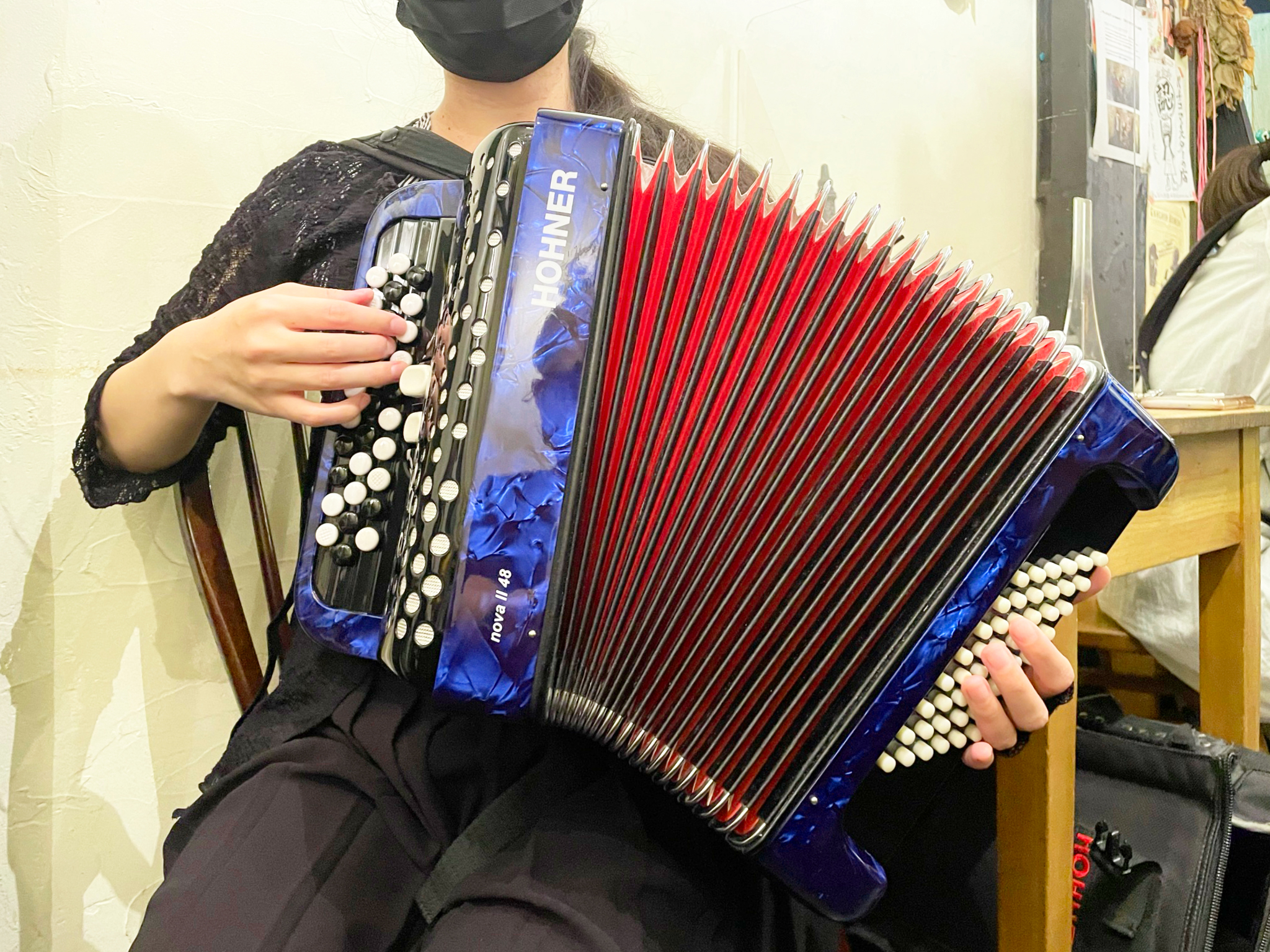
3 row chromatic

Chromatic button system (type C)

Chromatic button system (type B)

Six-row system used throughout the former Yugoslavia

Comparing the layout to the piano accordion, the advantages of a chromatic button accordion are the greater range and better fingering options. (Note: The uniform layout allows for uniform fingering and making of chords; meanwhile, the chromatic button layout also allows for alternative fingerings. As the buttons are closer, it is also easier to reach notes that are far apart, such as two octaves apart.) However, some fingering positions require twisting of the wrist and the aspect of alternative fingering patterns may stunt one in sessions of difficult sight reading.

Throughout the former Yugoslavia a 6-row chromatic button layout is used based on the B system. It is referred to as dugmetara. Accordions of this type often have a 140-bass Stradella bass layout.

== History ==
Early accordions were bisonoric instruments resembling modern diatonic button accordions. The first unisonoric accordions were built in Russia in the first half of the 1840s, with chromaticism not appearing until the 1850s.

There are several conflicting claims of the invention of the first chromatic button accordion. The first chromatic button accordion may have been constructed as early as 1850 by Franz Walther, in 1870 by Nikolai I. Belobodorev, or as late as 1891 by Georg Mirwald. Many early chromatic button accordions were similar in design to the schrammel accordion.

As the Stradella bass system would not be invented until later, these accordions often employed systems that would be considered unusual on a modern chromatic accordion, such as bisonoric bass buttons. Early chromatic button accordions were less popular than their diatonic counterpoints and unstandardized. The modern chromatic button accordion, featuring the Stradella bass system, was patented in 1897 by Paolo Soprani, with the assistance of Mattia Beraldi and Raimondo Piatanesi. Its production and sale by Paolo Soprani helped globally spread and standardize the chromatic button accordion.

== Notable artists ==
- Michèle Bernard
- Dimitri Bouclier
- Richard Galliano
- Yvette Horner

== See also ==
- Bayan
- Bandoneon
- Diatonic button accordion
- Piano accordion
- Isomorphic keyboard
