= Lizzie Rode =

Danish ballet dancer (1933–2017)

- Born: 12 September 1933; Copenhagen
- Died: 19 August 2017 (aged 83)
- Occupation: Ballet dancer
- Spouse(s): Ole Schmidt

Lizzie Rode (12 September 1933 - 19 August 2017) was a Danish ballet dancer. She spent most of her career with the Royal Danish Ballet.

Lizzie Rode was born on 12 September 1933 in Copenhagen, the daughter of Mogens Ferdinand Philipson and Gerda Catharina Rode Østerberg.

Rode began dancing at the Royal Danish Ballet in 1950. During the 1956-57 season she performed as the witch Madge in August Bournonville's La Sylphide and as the headmistress in David Lichine's Graduation Ball on the same evening. Other significant performances include Birgit Cullberg's Miss Julie in 1958 and Medea in 1959, Denis ApIvor and Alfred Rodrigues' Blood Wedding in 1960, Ole Schmidt's Ballet in D in 1961, Flemming Flindt's Enetime in 1964, and as Klytaimnestra in Eske Holm's Orestes during the 1972-73 season.She also was a stage director, with notable stagings of Bournonville's King's Volunteers on Amager In 1970 and Far from Denmark in 1973.

Rode served as Assistant Artistic Director of the Royal Danish Ballet from 1977 to 1988. She retired as a dancer in 1979.

== Personal life ==
Rode was married to Ernst Bülow from 1953 to 1960. In 1960, she married conductor and choreographer Ole Schmidt and they had two children.
