= Mogens Ellegaard =

Danish accordion player (1935–1995)

Mogens Ellegaard (4 March 1935 – 28 March 1995) was an accordion player from Denmark. He is regarded as the "father of the classical accordion."

== Early life ==
Ellegaard was the son of a cabinet maker and began studying the instrument at the age of eight.

When I started, there was absolutely no accordion culture. Unless, you define accordion culture as 'oom-pah-pah,' or the Cuckoo Waltz—that sort of thing. The free-bass accordion didn't exist—it was entirely unknown when I was a child. At that time the accordion world was living in splendid isolation. No contact at all with the outside musical world. Concerts for us consisted of Frosini, Deiro repertoire or folkloristic music. The possibilities of getting a formal, quality education [on accordion] were nil. The accordion was not accepted at any of the higher music institutions. . . . The possibilities for a soloist, for the best players, would be variety 'night club' work, Saturday night shows. . . . This is what I was doing when I was very young.

== Free-bass accordion ==
In 1952 Ellegaard competed at the Confédération internationale des accordéonistes Coupe Mondiale (World Cup) in the Netherlands. At this time he heard a free-bass accordion and decided he must get such an instrument. In the meantime, he studied literature at Schneekloth's College in Copenhagen and graduated with honors. After military service he was given an American Embassy Literary Award for study in the United States and supported himself in part by playing this accordion in restaurants and at popular concerts.

Ellegaard returned to Denmark in 1958 and the Danish pianist/composer Vilfred Kjaer (1906-1969) wrote a concerto for him, which led to the creation of a very popular concerto for accordion by the composer Ole Schmidt.

Ellegaard continued,

But in 1953 the first free-bass accordions were introduced in Denmark and, by coincidence, I was one of the first students to get such an instrument. . . . In 1957, the pianist Vilfred Kjaer, who was also well-known in our country as a composer of light music, wrote a concerto for me and through his good connections, he was able to organize the world premiere of Jubilesse infameuse. It was a work of light character, but anyway a beginning. At that concert, also by coincidence, [the composer] Ole Schmidt was sitting in the audience. He didn't like Kjaer's composition, but liked the instrument, and told me this bluntly afterwards. So I challenged him to write something better. In 1958 he wrote Symphonic Fantasy and Allegro, op. 20 for accordion and orchestra, which was the first really serious work for accordion written by a good composer.

Symphonic Fantasy and Allegro was premiered by the Danish Radio Symphony with the composer conducting. Ole Schmidt made the following comment about the work, "I hated accordion until I met Mogens Ellegaard. He made me decide to write an accordion concerto for him." Some of the works Mogens Ellegaard commissioned and premiered are:

- Hans Abrahamsen
  - Canzone (1977-8) for accordion solo
- Niels Viggo Bentzon
  - Concert voor accordeon (1962/63)
  - In the Zoo op. 164 (1964)
  - Sinfonia concertante (1965) for two accordions, string orchestra and percussion
- Antonio Bibalo
  - Sonata, quasi una fantasia (1977)
- Vagn Holmboe
  - Sonata, op. 143A (1979)
- Vilfred Kjær
  - Jubilesse infameuse, concerto (1957)
- Leif Kayser
  - Arabesques(1975)
  - Suite Sacra (1984)
  - Confetti (1992)
- Torbjörn Lundquist
  - Partita piccola (1963)
  - Metamorphoses (1965)
  - Nine two-part inventions (1966)
  - Plasticity - Plastiska varianter - Plastische Varianten... (1967)
  - Sonatina piccola (1967/1983)
  - Ballad, for 2 accordion (1968)
  - Botany play (1968)
  - Microscope, 21 pieces (1971)
  - Copenhagen music, for accordion solo and accordion quintet (1972)
  - Lappri (1972)
  - Assoziationen (1981)
- Arne Nordheim
  - Signals, for accordion, electric guitar and percussion (1967)
  - Dinosauros, for accordion and tape (1970)
  - Spur, for accordion and orchestra (1975)
  - Flashing (1985)
- Per Nørgård
  - Introduction and toccata(1964) (originally written for Lars Bjarne)
  - Anatomic Safari for accordion solo (1967)
  - Recall (1968) for accordion and orchestra
  - Arcana for accordion, electric guitar and percussion (1970)
- Steen Pade
  - Udflugt med umveje (Excursions With Detours) (1984)
  - Aprilis (1987)
  - Cadenza (1987)
- Karl Aage Rasmussen
  - Invention (1972)
- Ole Schmidt
  - Symphonic Fantasy and Allegro, op. 20 for accordion and orchestra (1958)
  - Toccata 1 op. 24 (1960)
  - Toccata 2 op. 28 (1964)
  - Escape of the meatball over the fence (1967)

Ellegaard has performed this contemporary music in solo recitals and chamber music concerts in Moscow, New York City, Tel Aviv, Amsterdam, Rome, Paris, Dublin, Reykjavík, Zagreb and Toronto, to name a few. He has been a soloist with London's Royal Philharmonic, the Detroit Symphony, the Toronto Symphony, Sudwestfunk Symphonie Orchester, Stockholm, Oslo and Helsinki Philharmonic orchestras, BBC Scottish Symphony, and all of the Danish orchestras. He has appeared at international festivals such as Warsaw Autumn, I.S.C.M., and Bergen. He was for many years a member of the Trio Mobile with percussionist Bent Lylloff and guitarist Ingolf Olsen, commissioning pieces from Thorbjörn Lundquist, Ib Nørholm, Arne Nordheim, Per Nørgård, Finn Mortensen and others. As a chamber musician he was later concertizing extensively with a trio consisting of his Hungarian born pianist, and accordionist wife, Marta Bene and percussionist Gert Sørensen.

== Accordion professor ==
In the early-1960s Ellegaard began working with Lars Holm at the Malmö Sweden Accordion Studio where he taught free-bass accordion. He wrote "Comprehensive Method for the Chromatic Free Bass System" which was published by Hohner in New York City in 1964. In 1970 he founded the accordion department at The Royal Danish Academy of Music in Copenhagen. In 1977 he became a full professor.

In 1989 he was appointed head of the accordion faculty of the Hochschule fur Musik und Darstellende Kunst in Graz, Austria. He has conducted master class courses and seminars at Warsaw's Chopin Academy, Helsinki's Sibelius Academy, Trossingen Bundesakademie (Germany), and Conservatories in the Netherlands, Spain, etc. Today his students teach at Scandinavian music academies, as well as at the Royal Academy in London, many Conservatories in Germany, the Netherlands, and other locations.

== CDs ==
- Contemporary Danish Accordion Music, Point, PCD 5073 (1987) met Danish Radio Symphony Orchestra o.l.v. Ole Schmidt
- Jeux à trois, G.E.M. 2001 (1994), Music for classical accordion and percussion, met Márta Bene, accordeon en Gert Sørensen, slagwerk.
- Mogens Ellegaard discography at Discogs
