= Dimitri Bouclier =

French musician

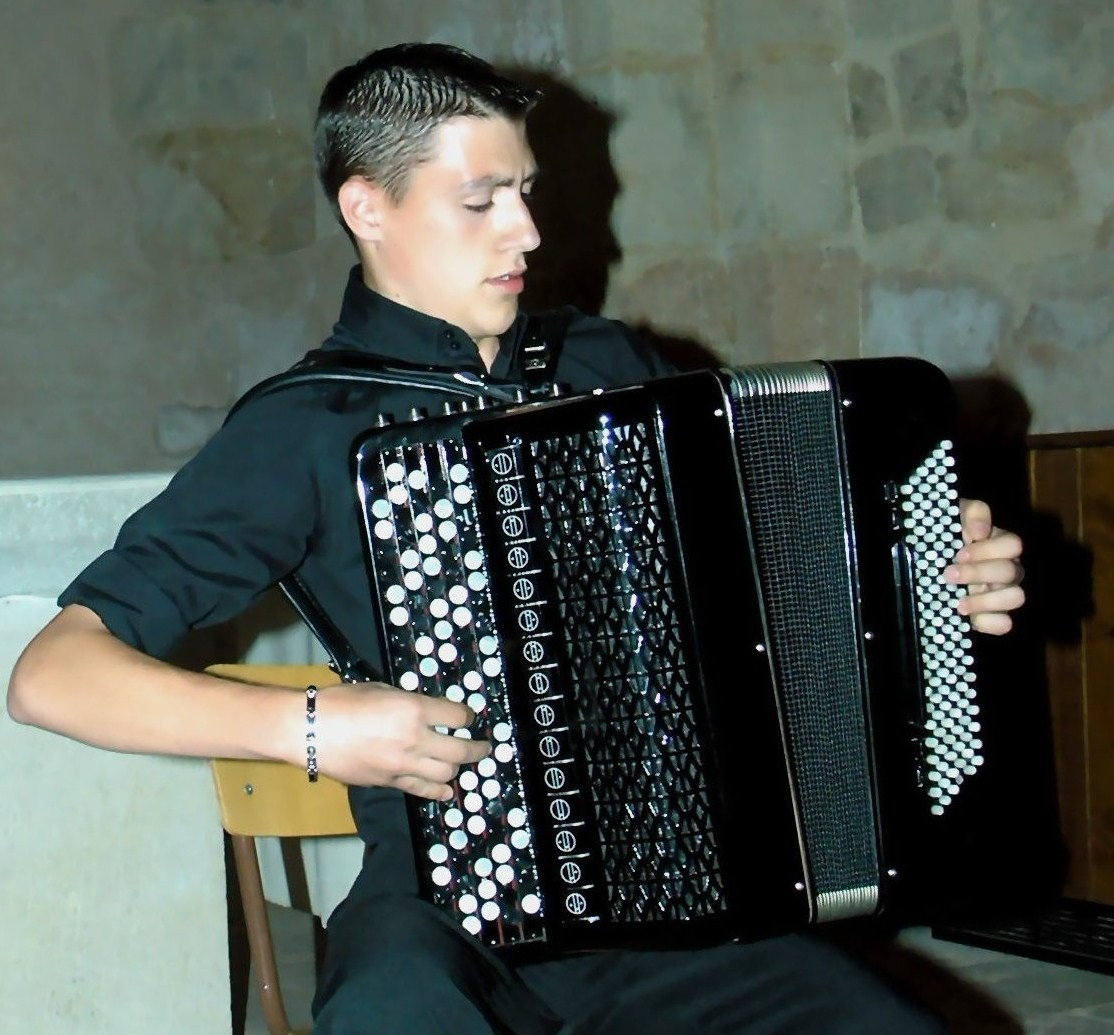
- Dimitri Bouclier
- Occupation: French musician

Dimitri Bouclier, born in France the 19 April 1989 is a classical accordion performer.

== Biography ==
Dimitri Bouclier begins the accordion at 7 years old, he made his debut solo recital and is invited in first part of famous concert performer (M-A. Nicolas, François-René Duchable, Peter Soave, A. Skliarov, C. Thomain, ...) since he's 10 years old.

He studies the accordion with his father, Thierry Bouclier, director of the Annemasse Accordion School and Mr Jacques Mornet in the CNIMA of Saint-Sauves-d'Auvergne.

Between the ages of 10 and 19, he became one of the youngest prize-winners at international competitions including Klingenthal, the World Trophy, the World Cup, and Castelfidardo.

In 2000, he wins the international competition "Azzola-Vladislav Zolotaryov" in Aubagne in category concert performer less than 12 years old.

In 2003, he wins the international competition of Klingenthal (Germany) in category concert performer less than 15 years old.

In 2004, he wins the competition "Young Talents" of Montrond les Bains, the Max Francy Prize and the André Thépaz Prize.

In 2005, he wins the Alexander Skliarov Prize and the biggest accordion international competition: the World Trophy in Bourboule and the World Cup in Portugal in classic junior category (less than 18 years old).

In March 2008, he wins the international prize of Montrond les Bains in category senior concert performer.

In October 2008, at only 19 years old, he is prize winner of most important accordion international competitions in senior category like Klingenthal, Premio di Castelfidardo, Coupe Mondiale in Glasgow and the first prize unanimously of the World Trophy in Sarajevo.

He was invited to the International Festival of Kragujevac in Serbia. He performed recital solo, in chamber music and with orchestra in France, Switzerland, Germany, Scotland, Portugal, Italy, Bosnia.

The duet with his brother, Julien Bouclier, violinist, is prize-winner of International competitions of chamber music in Glasgow, Castelfidardo and Roubaix.

In 2009, he signs a contract with the artistic agent M. Gershunoff (U.S.), the former agent of M. Rostropovitch, Yo-Yo Ma, ...

In 2010, he won the first prize at the Cziffra foundation and in 2013, at the Fondation d'entreprise Banque Populaire.
