= Button accordion =

Musical instrument

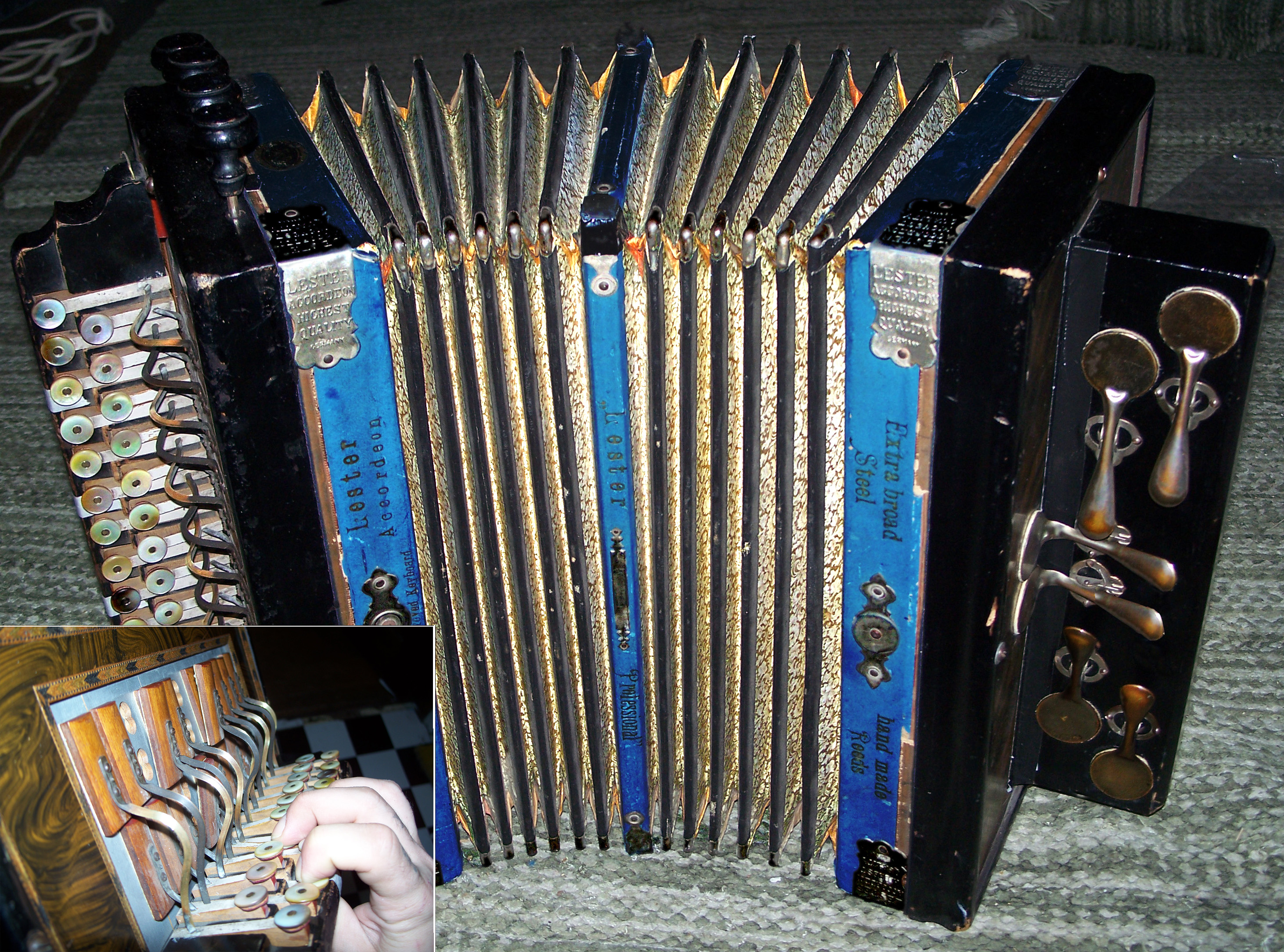
Diatonic button accordion (German make, early 20th century)

A button accordion is a type of accordion on which the melody-side keyboard consists of a series of buttons. This differs from the piano accordion, which has piano-style keys. Erich von Hornbostel and Curt Sachs categorize it as a free reed aerophone in their classification of instruments, published in 1914. The sound from the instrument is produced by the vibration of air in reeds. Button accordions of various types are particularly common in European countries and countries where European people settled. The button accordion is often confused with the concertina; the button accordion's buttons are on the front of the instrument, while the concertina's are on the sides and pushed in parallel with the bellows.

== Main components ==
All accordions and concertinas have three main components: the reeds, bellows, and buttons or keys. Pushing or pulling the bellows slower or faster makes the sound softer or louder, respectively. The accordion has free reeds on both the treble and bass sides. In modern accordions, the free reeds are generally made of tempered steel. The press of a button or key opens a valve to allow air to pass through the reed or reeds to make a sound when the bellows are pumped in or out. In the diatonic button accordion, reeds are fixed in pairs so that one note sounds when air moves in, and a different one when air moves out. The button accordion has melodic notes on one side of the bellows (usually the right side), and bass accompaniment notes on the other side (generally the left).

Some button accordions have 'stops', which change the tone and are called things like "Organ" or "Trumpet" or "Tremolo". These allow the instrument to produce different tones for a variety of situations. Some popular examples are the three-stop accordion, with two sets of tenor reeds and one bass set, and the classic German four-stop. The three-stop accordion has two sets of tenor and one set of bass reeds. The German four-stop is preferred by Cajun musicians and has one bass, one piccolo, and two tenor stops. This gives the instrument a denser sound. Most diatonic instruments lack switches, though there are some made by companies such as Hohner, as well as the one-row 'Cajun'-type boxes which have usually 3 or 4 stops on top of the box as switches (making it even more akin to a pipe organ), but it is generally more common to find switches on a chromatic or piano accordion.

== Variations ==
Button accordions are found with a wide variety of keyboard systems, tuning, action, and construction.

The diatonic button accordion is bisonoric, meaning when a button is pressed, the note sounded changes depending on whether the bellows are being expanded or contracted. This is similar to the harmonica, where the note changes depending on whether the player is breathing in or out. In most diatonic button accordions, each row of melody buttons produces a different major scale, with accidentals on 'helper buttons' at the ends of the rows. The diatonic button accordion is the most popular type of button accordion, and appears in many cultures, especially in folk music.

One popular type of diatonic button accordion is the standard, one-row button accordion. This is tuned to a diatonic, 2.5 octave scale. The accompaniment side (bass/chordal side) buttons play a tonic chord when pushed, and dominant chord when pulled. This works well and is popular in basic Anglo-American fiddle tunes. The German melodeon was a popular, later version of a diatonic button accordion, especially in Scotland until around the 1920s.

The chromatic button accordion is very similar to piano accordion, but can have 3, 4, or 5 rows of buttons on the right hand side. It is unisonoric, meaning the same note is sounded whether the bellows are pushed or pulled. The chromatic button accordion is traditionally used in a concert setting, and is more popular in jazz and classical music because it can be freely played in any key, usually with identical fingering patterns.

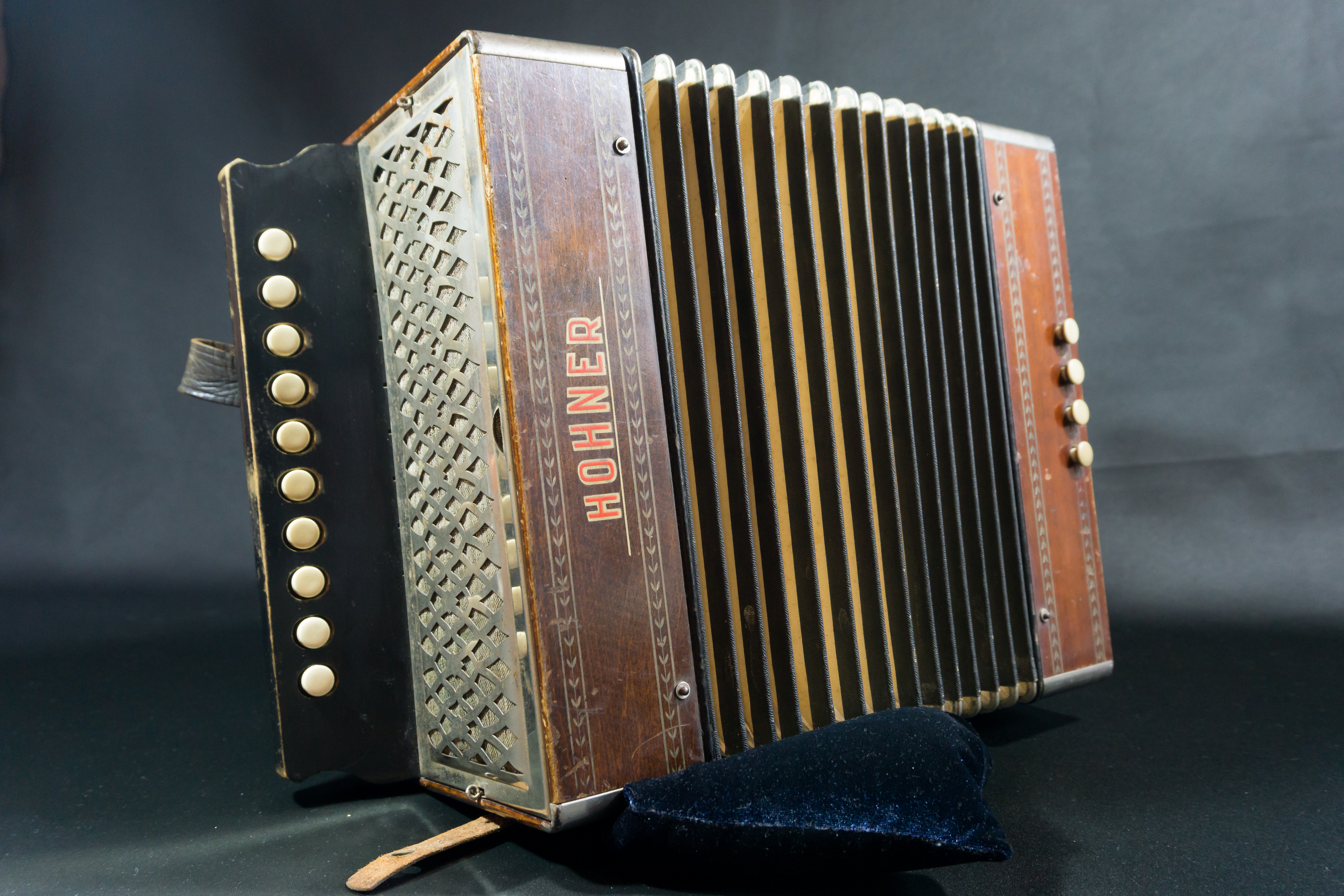
One-row diatonic button accordion

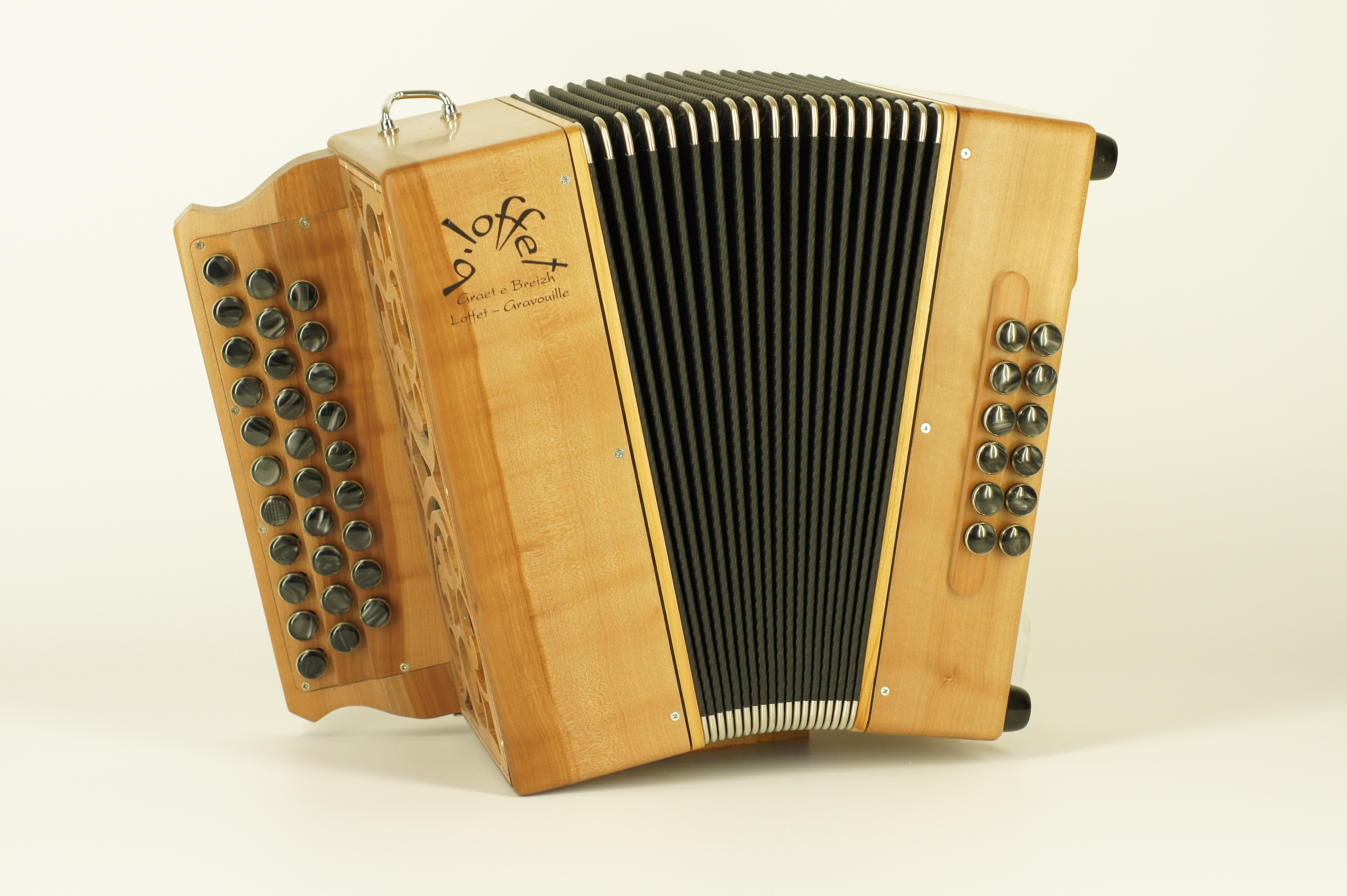
Three-row diatonic button accordion

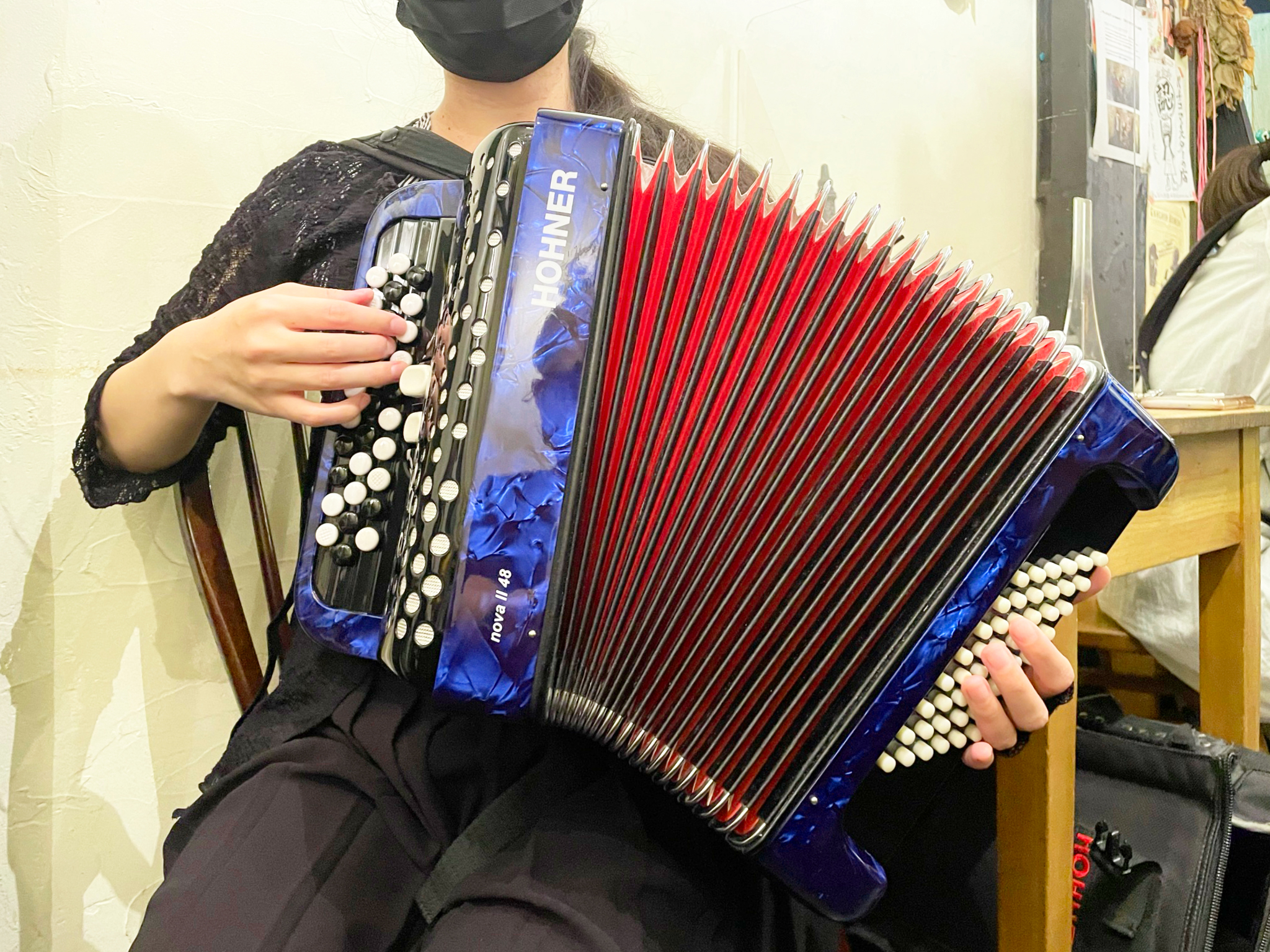
Three-row chromatic button accordion

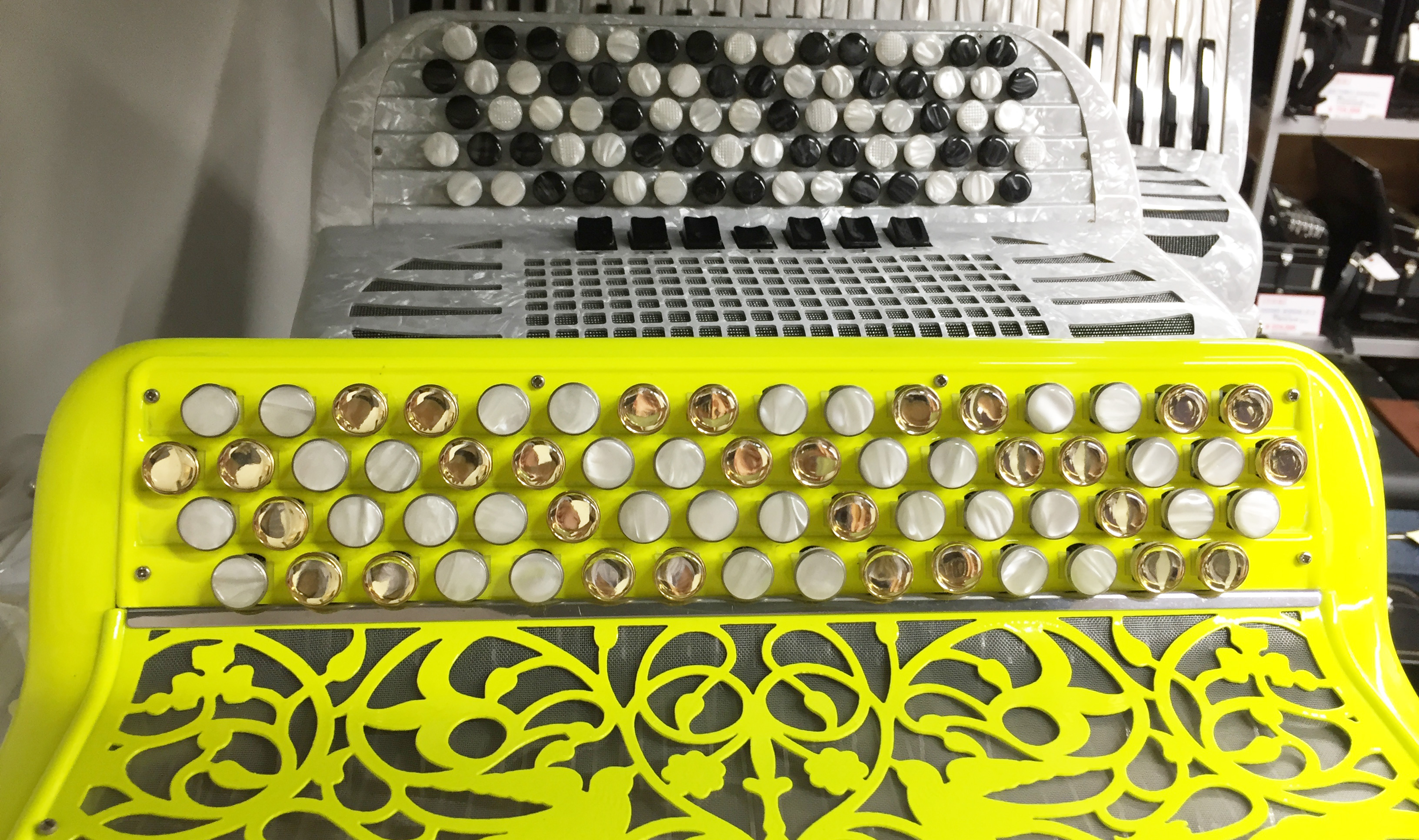
Four-row and five-row chromatic button accordion

== History ==
The first diatonic button accordion was patented under the name 'Accordion' in 1829 by Cyril Demian. The same year, Charles Wheatstone made the first concertina. The first chromatic button accordion was made by Franz Walther in 1850. The name 'Accordion' is thought to originate from Akkord, the German word for chord. The accordion may have originated with traditional reed instruments from southeast Asia. The button accordion was first mass-produced in Europe in 1835, with the piano accordion coming later. It was the first mass-produced, loud, durable, portable instrument – though it was not cheap. At first, the button accordion was too expensive to be very common among the lower and middle classes, but as it lost its novelty (around the 1860s), it became more widespread among these groups, too. Surviving early instruments show that at first they only played chords, and were to be played left-handed, unlike now. The first accordions only had 5 buttons (10 chords), so they were mostly used for accompaniment.

Early minstrel troupes toured America as early as 1843, spreading the accordion sound. The button accordion was ideal for dance music of many cultures, because one could play both the melody and accompaniment at once, and still be able to sing or tap one's feet. The many reeds produce a louder sound, ideal for a crowded dance hall.

== Cultures ==
=== Brazil ===
==== Northeast ====
The diatonic 2-row button accordion with eight bass buttons is still very common in northeast Brazil. It is known as the fole to distinguish it from the piano accordion. It first appeared there in the late nineteenth century. Previously, one-row diatonic button accordions with two bass buttons were used. Later, chromatic accordions grew in popularity, increasing the possible styles that could be played on them.

=== Ireland ===
The concertina, button accordion, and piano accordion are all popular in Irish traditional music. The button accordion was first available for sale in Ireland in 1831.

=== North America ===
==== Newfoundland, Canada ====
The button accordion is a primary melodic instrument in traditional Newfoundland music.

==== Mexico & Texas, US ====
The button accordion is very common in Tejano (Texas-Mexican) music. The two-row button accordion is very common, with some variation. Mexican norteño musicians prefer accordions with more vibrato, and Texan musicians favor less vibrato. The vibrato comes from tuning the reeds ever so slightly different from one another.

==== Louisiana, US ====
The button accordion arrived in Louisiana in the 1800s. It was a popular instrument with the Cajuns and the French-speaking creoles. Later, a new, higher-quality version of the button accordion was made in Louisiana, which became and remained popular with Cajun and Zydeco players. The Acadian tradition of southern Louisiana influenced some, such as Huddie "Leadbelly" Leadbetter. The button accordion was especially popular among African-Americans in Louisiana from 1880 to 1910, who called it the windjammer, a name still in use.

=== Sub-Saharan Africa ===
Starting in the 19th century, the button accordion has played a part in sub-Saharan African music. It was brought there by sailors, merchants, and settlers, and is used solo and in dance bands.

== Notable players ==
- Huddie "Leadbelly" Leadbetter: One of the first African-Americans to make commercial recordings on the button accordion. He was from Caddo Parish, Louisiana and made recordings of rural African-American music on the accordion from 1942 to 1947. His music was influenced by the Acadian style of southern Louisiana.
- Flaco Jiménez: Popular accordionist in Tejano music.
- Gilberto Reyes: Popular accordionist in Tejano music. He repaired and tuned his own accordions, and made changes to his own button accordion. Because of this, the Hohner instrument company noticed him and invited him to work with them. He changed the tuning of the reeds in the button accordion to develop an accordion with Flaco Jiménez' preferred sound, making it ideal for Texas-Mexican music.
- Narciso Martínez: Often called an 'accordion pioneer' in Tejano music.
- Zé Calixto: Popular accordion virtuoso in northeast Brazil. Brother to Luizinho Calixto.
- Luizinho Calixto: Popular accordion virtuoso in northeast Brazil. Brother to Zé Calixto.
- Sharon Shannon: Irish musician
- David Hidalgo: Of the band Los Lobos

== See also ==
- List of All Ireland button accordion champions
- Bandoneon
- Bayan
- Concertina
- Garmon
- Melodeon
- Piano accordion
- Squeezebox
- Steirische Harmonika
