= Piano accordion =

Musical instrument

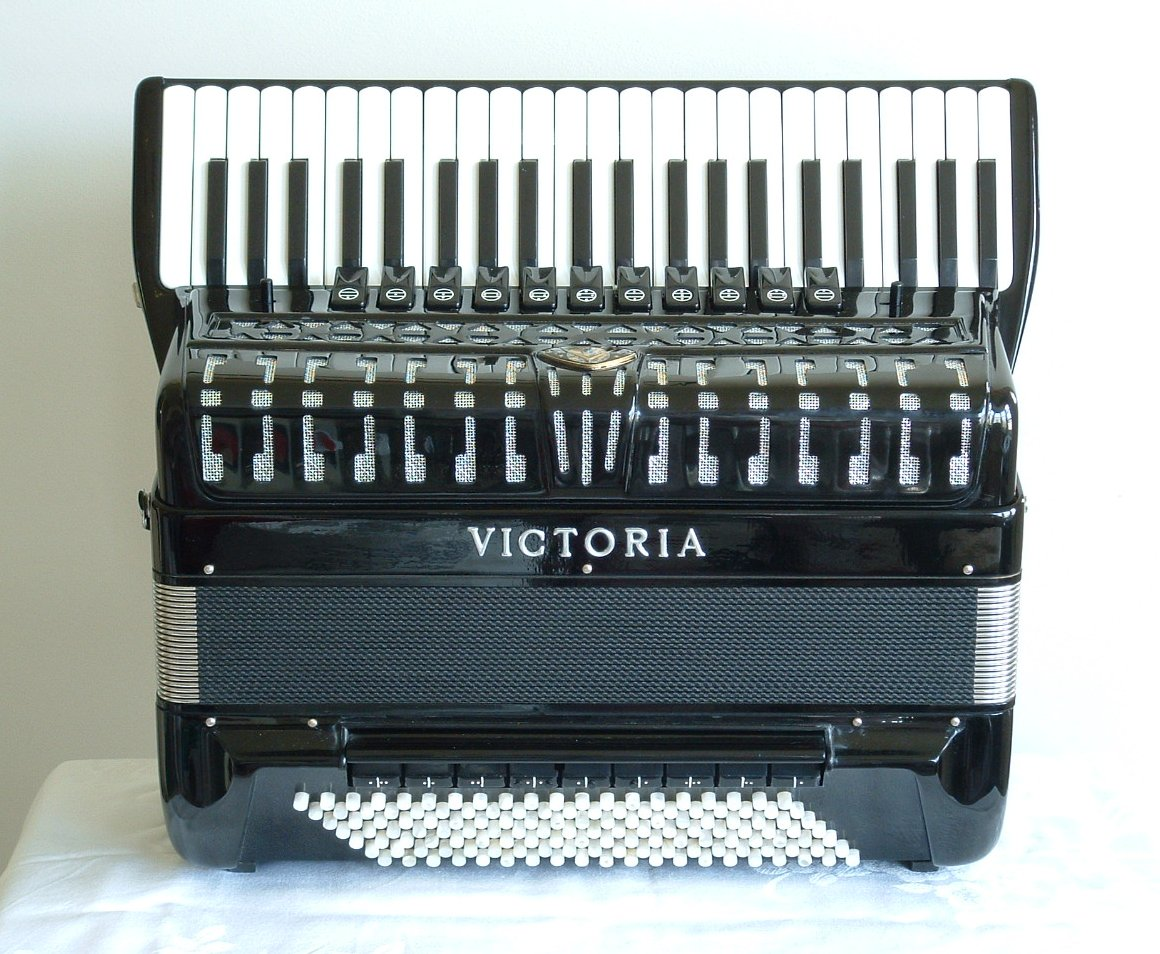
- Classification: Free-reed aerophone

Playing range
- Right-hand manual: F3 to A6 (scientific pitch notation) is the written range for the right-hand manual of a standard 120-bass/41-key piano accordion, three octaves plus a major third. Actual range sounds one octave lower and one octave higher (F2-A7) depending on stops chosen. There are piano accordions with up to 49 Keys from written D3 to D7 (D2 to D8 sounding range) & the Top D8 is a step above High C on Piano, some have a 32 ft stop on the Treble to extend the range down to a sounding D1. Left-hand manual: Stradella bass system; Free-bass system

Musicians
- List of accordionists

More articles or information
- Accordion, Chromatic button accordion, Bayan, Diatonic button accordion, Piano accordion, Stradella bass system, Free-bass system, Accordion reed ranks & switches

A piano accordion is an accordion equipped with a right-hand keyboard similar to a piano or organ. Its acoustic mechanism is more that of an organ than a piano, as they are both aerophones, but the term "piano accordion"—coined by Guido Deiro in 1910—has remained the popular name. It may be equipped with any of the available systems for the left-hand manual.

In comparison with a piano keyboard, the keys are more rounded, smaller, and lighter to the touch. These go vertically down the side, pointing inward, toward the bellows, making them accessible to only one hand while handling the accordion. (Note: Felt or rubber is placed under the piano keys to control touch and key noise: it is also used on the pallets to silence notes not sounded by preventing air flow. This material eventually wears with use, resulting in a clacking noise, so has to be replaced to quieten the mechanism.)

The bass piano accordion is a variation of a piano accordion without bass buttons, with the piano keyboard sounding an octave lower than the usual low-pitched "bassoon" stop. They typically have around 3 octaves. Arrangements for accordion band may include parts for bass accordion.

== History ==
The first accordion to feature a piano keyboard was probably the instrument introduced in 1852 by Bouton of Paris. Another source claimed the first piano accordion was introduced in 1854 at the General German Industrial Exhibition in Munich. It was showcased by the instrument builder Mattäus Bauer and quickly became a serious competitor to button accordions.

The first chromatic piano-like accordions in Russia were built in 1871 by Nikolay Ivanovich Beloborodov.

In the United States, the piano accordion dramatically increased in popularity between 1900 and 1930 because of its familiarity to students and teachers, and its uniformity, whereby accordion dealers and instructors did not have to support different styles of accordions for many European immigrant groups. The piano keyboard layout was also promoted by the fame of Vaudeville performers Guido Deiro and his brother Pietro who premiered the instrument on stage, recordings and radio. After the Deiros' success, popular chromatic button accordionist Pietro Frosini chose to disguise his accordion's buttons to look like a piano keyboard so as not to appear "old-fashioned." (See Accordion music genres)

As of 1972 it could be largely said that the piano system dominated the English-speaking North American continent, Scotland, and certain East European countries, while differing button systems are generally to be found in Scandinavia, France, Belgium and former Soviet countries. The piano accordion is also predominant in Italy, New Zealand, Australia and South Africa.

== See also ==
- Accordion reed ranks and switches
- Button accordion
- Bandoneon
- Squeezebox
- List of All-Ireland piano accordion champions
