= Bayan (accordion) =

Musical instrument

- Classification: Free-reed aerophone
- Hornbostel–Sachs classification: 412.132

Playing range
- Right-hand manual: The Russian bayan and chromatic button accordions have a much greater right-hand range in scientific pitch notation than accordions with a piano keyboard: five octaves, plus a minor third (written range = E2-G7, actual range = E1-C#8). Left-hand manual: Stradella bass system; Free-bass system

Musicians
- List of accordionists

More articles or information
- Accordion, chromatic button accordion, diatonic button accordion, piano accordion, stradella bass system, free-bass system, accordion reed ranks and switches

The bayan (Russian: баян, IPA: [bɐˈjan]) is a type of chromatic button accordion developed in the Russian Empire in the early 20th century and named after the 11th-century bard Boyan.

== Characteristics ==
Chromatic button system (type B), usually called Moscow system; most Russian bayans have this system

"West European", chromatic button system (type C)

The bayan differs from western chromatic button accordions in some details of construction:

- Reeds are broader and rectangular (rather than trapezoidal).
- Reeds are often attached in large groups to a common plate (rather than in pairs); the plates are screwed to the reed block (rather than attached with wax).
- The melody-side keyboard is attached near the middle of the body (rather than at the rear).
- Reeds are generally not tuned with tremolo.
- Register switches may be operated with the chin on some larger models (also possible with some larger European button accordions).
- The diminished chord row is shifted, so that the diminished G chord is where one would expect the diminished C chord in the Stradella bass system.
- Converter switches that go from standard preset chords to free bass (individual bass notes) are common on the larger instruments. As opposed to Western conventions, in free bass mode the low notes usually are at the bottom of the instrument and the high notes at the top.
- Newer instruments may feature a register where every tone played actually produces a perfect fifth.

The differences in internal construction give the bayan a different tone color from Western instruments, and the bass has a much fuller sound. Because of their range and purity of tone, bayans are often the instrument of choice for accordion virtuosi who perform classical and contemporary classical music. Two Soviet composers of note who wrote compositions for bayan are Vladislav Zolotaryov and Sofia Gubaidulina. Slovak composer Peter Machajdík composed Concerto for Two Bayans and Orchestra, which was premiered by Acco Duo (Miran Vaupotić & Ivana Levak-Vaupotić), with the Symphony Orchestra of the Pomeranian Philharmonic under Alexander Gref, at the Paderewski Philharmonic in Bydgoszcz, Poland on 4 June 2009. Russian Bayan virtuoso Stas Venglevski has premiered contemporary works by Yehuda Yannay, Anthony Galla-Rini, Airat Ichmouratov and William Susman.

== See also ==
- Chromatic button accordion
- Russian folk music

== General and cited references ==
- Cherkaskyi, L. (2003). Ukrainski narodni muzychni instrumenty. Kyiv, Ukraine: Tekhnika. ISBN 978-966-575-111-3.
