= Free-bass system =

Accordion buttonboard layout system

A free-bass system is a system of left-hand bass buttons on an accordion, arranged to give the performer greater ability to play melodies with the left-hand and form one's own chords. The left-hand buttonboard consists of single-note buttons with a range of three octaves or more, in contrast to the standard Stradella bass system, which offers a shorter range of single bass notes, plus preset major, minor, dominant seventh, and diminished chord buttons. (Pressing a single preset chord button sounds a three-note chord.) The term "free-bass system" refers to various left-hand manual systems that provide this functionality: The Stradella system does not have buttons for different octaves of the bass notes, which limits the types of melodies and basslines that can be performed with the left hand.

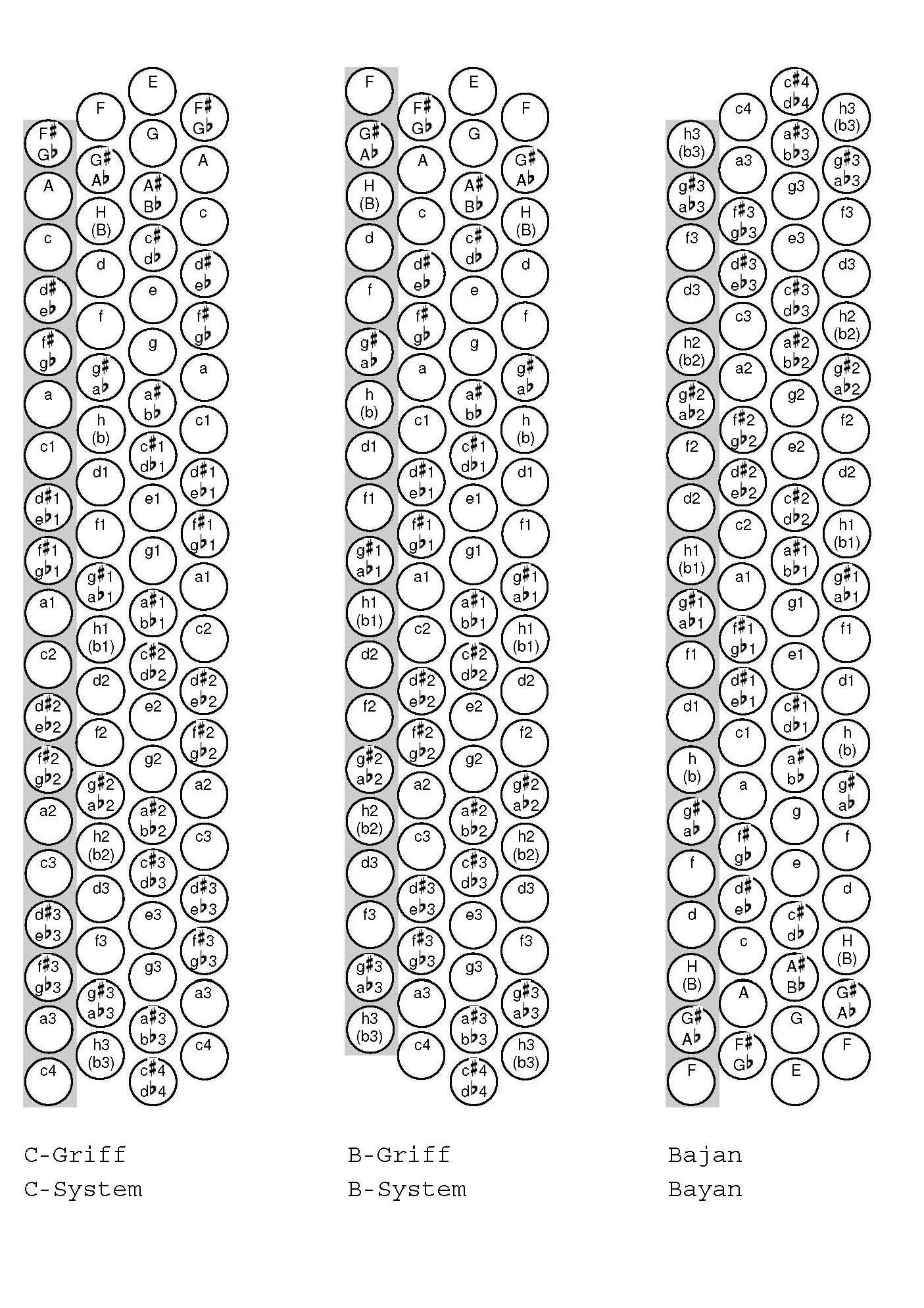
Three chromatic free-bass systems compared

- Two related layouts exist as mirror versions of the chromatic button accordion, these were marketed in the US by the Giulietti Accordion Company as "Bassetti".
- The "quint" free-bass system invented by Willard Palmer – later patented by Titano, has extra bass rows to extend the existing bass arrangement of the Stradella system.
- The quint version and chromatic-button versions were available in "converter" (or "transformer") models with a control to switch from standard Stradella to free-bass.
- A piano-like layout exists that mirrors the right-hand keyboard of a piano accordion, with round buttons laid out like piano keys. This system is popular in Asian piano accordions, especially in Azeri garmon.
- A hybrid Chromatic/Stradella system known as the Moschino free-bass system is available. The system arranges the left-hand buttons so chromatic arrangement of keys, adjoining Circle-of-Fifths, chord inversions, and alternate chord voicings are available to the player simultaneously. A famous accordion musician and proponent of the advantages of the Moschino free-bass system was George Secor, and links to a more detailed description of the system is included on his wikipedia page.
- Other less popular arrangements exist, such as the Kuehl system.

== History ==
By the year 1900, the Stradella bass system had principally reached its current construction with 120 buttons over six rows. However, while that setup worked well for major and minor music accompanied by many chords, the performer would only have access to about a major seventh of bass notes while playing, or two octaves with a timely shift of registers. The problem was solved in the early 1900s by adding three rows of chromatically ordered single notes next to the standard bass. In 1900 in Moscow Russian master Bakanov made a garmon with piano keyboards for both right and left hands each w/ 30 Keys from C to F. From 1906 the brothers Kiselevs' factory in Tula began to produce bayans with the three-row free-bass left keyboard.

In the United States, the virtuoso John Serry Sr. designed and built a working model of a free-bass system to assist in the performance of both classical and symphonic jazz compositions in 1940. It incorporated dual keyboards for the soloists' left hand based upon two sets of reeds which were tuned in octaves. This provided the soloist with a total range of tones which exceeded three and one half octaves. The dual keyboard design is illustrated below and was accessed through the use of a switch mechanism to provide independent access for the performers thumb onto Keyboard #2 and the performer's remaining fingers onto Keyboard #1.

Keyboard #2

 __F#_G#_A#____C#_D#____F#_G#_A#____C#_D#____F#_G#_A#____C#_
 _F__G__A__B__C__D__E__F__G__A__B__C__D__E__F__G__A__B__C__D_

Keyboard #1

 ___F#_G#_A#____C#_D#____F#_G#_A#____C#_D#____F#_G#_A#____C#__
 __F__G__A__B__C__D__E__F__G__A__B__C__D__E__F__G__A__B__C__D_

=== Efforts to popularize ===
Thus this Hohner company decided to enlarge the market for accordions (Note: Monichon wrote, "En 1912, la maison Hohner produira ses premières « basses chromatiques » .... La 'Coopérative Stradella' mettra au point, en 1912, un instrument de 120 basses avec trois rangées de 'notes chromatique'..."—Pierre Monichon, Francesco Giannattasio and B. Bugiolacchi, Chronological Synthesis of the Evolution of the Accordion (1984).) by turning the instrument from its traditional music roots into an established instrument for orchestras. An orchestra was put together, touring Germany to introduce the new concept. The company also supplied sheet music for this new type of accordion. Although these were reportedly popular, it was not until later when the instrument became more widespread.

In Northern Europe, free-bass accordionist Mogens Ellegaard, along with Hugo Noth and Joseph Macerollo, helped popularize the instrument and inspire compositions for it. (Note: Ole Schmidt made the following comment: "I hated accordion until I met Mogens Ellegaard. He made me decide to write an accordion concerto for him." Ole Schmidt, cited in the CD booklet for Contemporary Danish Accordion Music, performed by Mogens Ellegaard with the Danish Radio Symphony Orchestra, conducted by Ole Schmidt (Solrod Strand, Denmark: Independent Music, 1987).) In an interview he describes how the free-bass accordion was still practically non-existent in his childhood (born 1935), but how composers in his native Denmark began to write works for him since 1958. In 1968 he arranged the manufacture of accordions with nothing but free-bass layouts to accommodate newcomers, as free-bass accordions would otherwise always include standard bass.

In some Russian, Canadian and European music conservatoires, free bass accordion is considered a serious instrument for study and there is now a large modern repertoire for it. Free bass accordion is taught at the undergraduate and post-graduate levels at the National Autonomous University of Mexico in Mexico City. In the United States, free bass instruments are much less well known despite attempts to popularize them by Palmer and Hughes and the Giulietti Accordion Company in the 1960s and 1970s. In Canada, the accordionist Joseph Macerollo even collaborated on the development of a detailed syllabus for students of the Free-bass accordion while on the faculty of the Royal Conservatory of Music Toronto (RCMT) in the mid 20th century.

During this period several American accordionists demonstrated the unique orchestral sound of the instrument through live performances as well as by composing original works which featured the instrument. Included among this group was John Serry, Sr. whose Concerto for Free Bass Accordion was completed during the 1960s. (See Accordion music genres)
