= Mie Miki =

Japanese accordion musician

Professor Mie Miki 御喜 美江
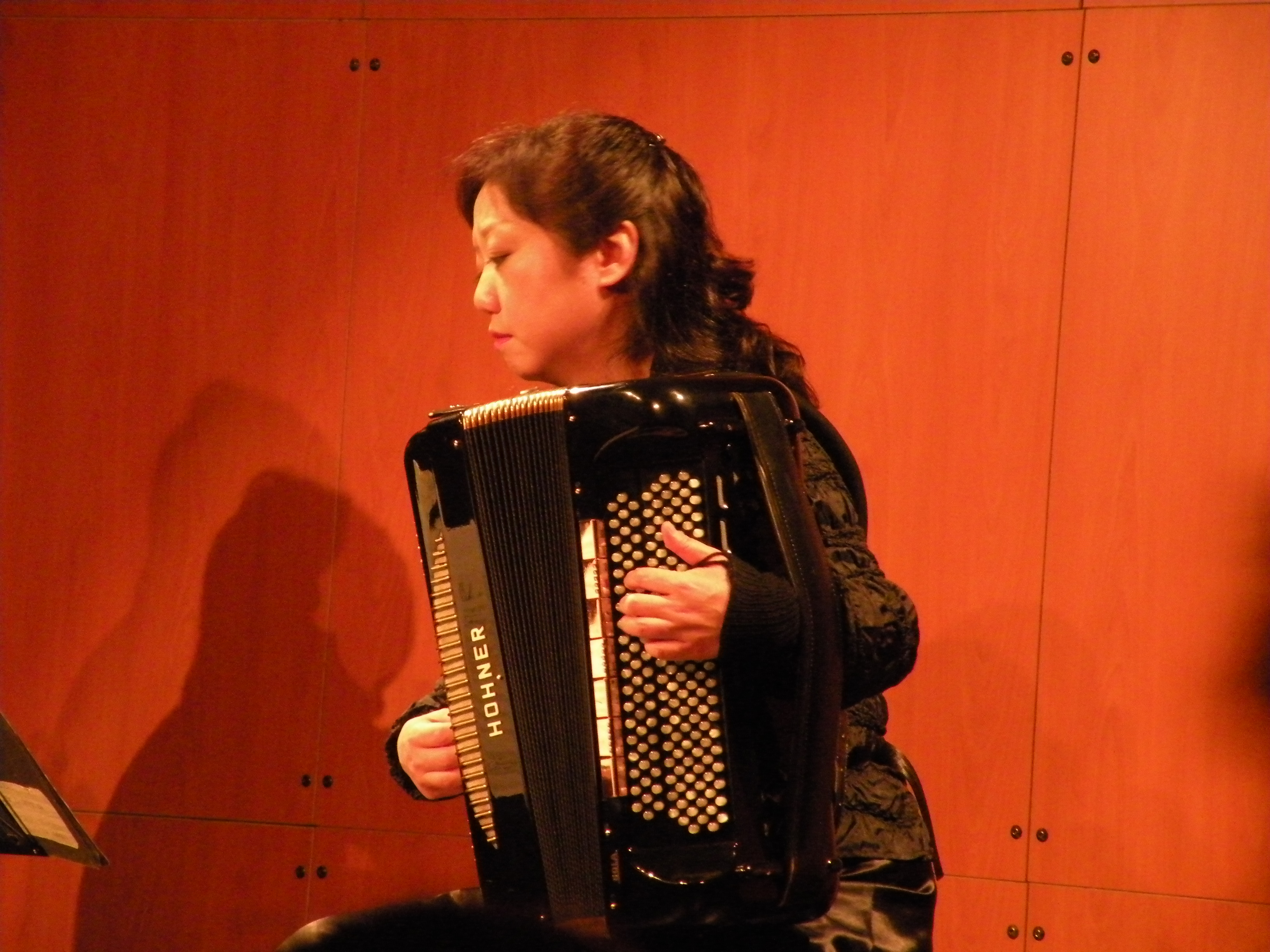

Background information
- Born: 1956; Tokyo
- Occupation(s): Professor and Vice President at Folkwang University of the Arts, Germany
- Instrument: Accordion
- Years active: 1964–present
- Spouse: Georg Friedrich Schenck

Mie Miki is a classical accordion musician. She took up the accordion at age 4 and has been dubbed "Queen of the Classical Accordion". She is a professor of accordion as well as Vice President at Folkwang University of the Arts and is honorary professor at the Xinjian Arts College. She has published at least 16 albums since 1984 and her work appears on more than 26 albums. She won the Japan Music Pen Club Award 2014 and the Opus Klassik prize in 2018.
