= Joseph Macerollo =

Canadian musician (born 1944)

Joseph Anthony Macerollo
- Born: October 1, 1944; Guelph, Ontario, Canada
- Education: University of Toronto
- Occupations: Free Bass Accordionist, educator, author
- Awards: Order of Canada
- Website: www.josephmacerollo.com

Joseph Nicholas Anthony Macerollo, OC (born October 1, 1944) is a Canadian classical accordionist, music educator and author. He was appointed an Officer of the Order of Canada in 2013 for his achievements as a musician, educator and promoter of the free bass accordion on the concert hall stage.

== Biography ==
=== Early life and education ===
Macerollo was born in the city of Guelph in the province of Ontario, Canada. His studies on the accordion began at the age of six with Nicholas Antonelli and later in 1960 with Charles Camilleri. After winning several awards at competitions and music festivals during the late 1950s and early 1960s, he appeared in several nightclubs and subsequently collaborated in 1969 with Phil Nimmons. He was awarded both the Bachelor of Music degree in 1965 and the Masters of Musicology degree in 1969 at the University of Toronto.

=== Academic career ===
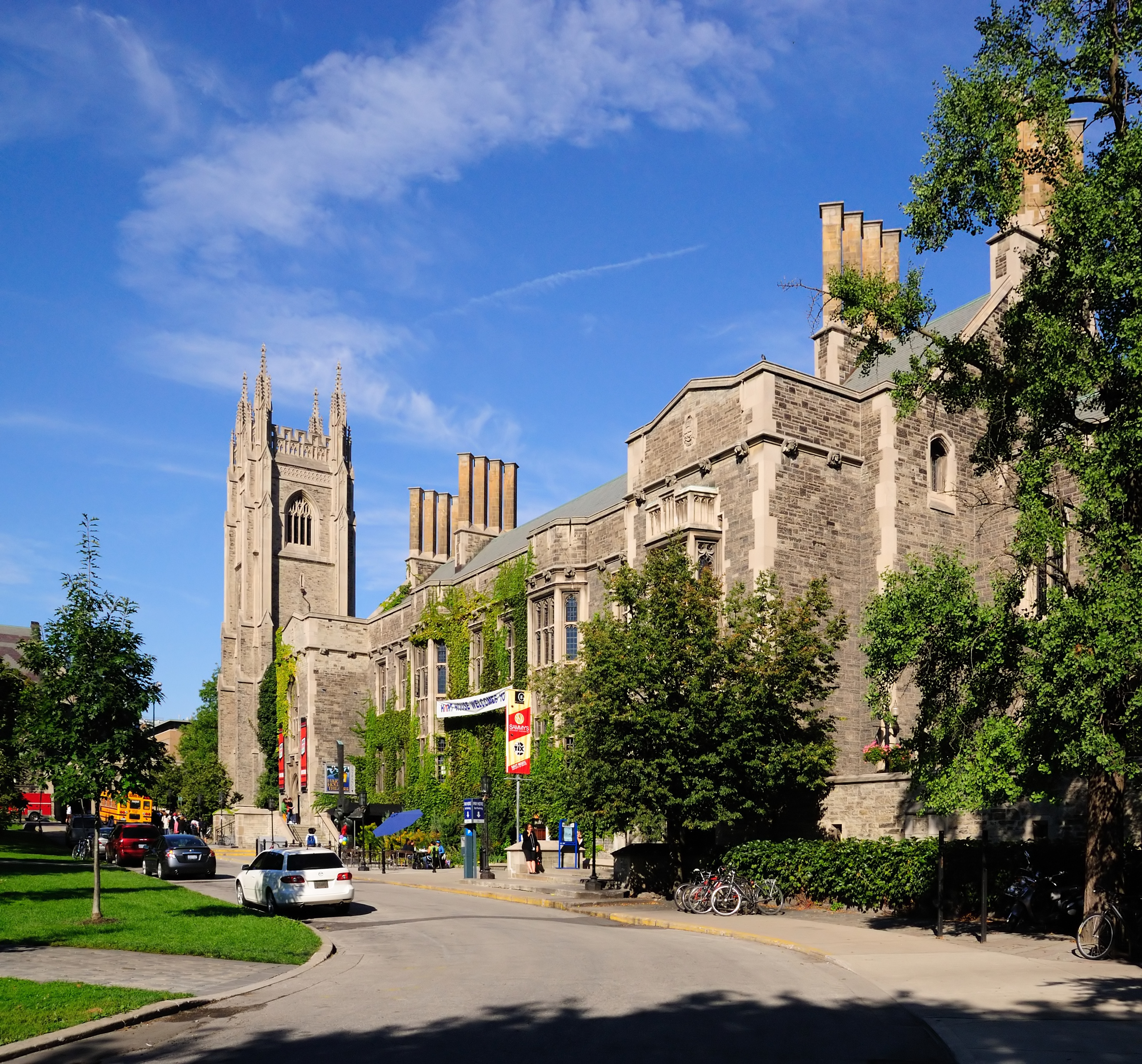
University of Toronto: ON - Hart House

From 1969–1985 served on the faculty of the Royal Conservatory of Music in Toronto, Canada, where he also collaborated on the development of the first syllabus for the free bass accordion. In 1969 he also joined the faculty at Queen's University Kingston. In later years, he was welcomed onto the faculty at the University of Toronto (1972). By 1987 he emerged as a faculty member at Wilfrid Laurier University.

External audio
- You may hear Joseph Macerollo and the Quartetto Gelato performing in "Neapolitan Cafe" in 2001; Here on Archive.org

Macerollo has concertized on both CBC Radio and CBC Television. He has also collaborated with a variety of classical music ensembles including: the Toronto Symphony, the Chamber Players of Toronto, the Orford String Quartet, the Purcell String Quartet, Quartetto Gelato and the Hart House Orchestra.

In addition, he has also authored several articles on the development of the accordion as a modern musical instrument.

During the course of his extensive concert career, Macerollo has performed on accordions designed by several leading international manufacturers including: Hohner Music Instruments in Germany and Giulietti Accordions in the United States.

=== Honours ===
Officer of the Order of Canada - ribbon for ordinary uniform

Officer of the Order of Canada
"For his pioneering achievements as a musician and educator and for bringing the classical accordion to Canadian concert halls."
— 2013

=== Publications ===
Included among Joseph Macerollo's publications are the following:

External image
- Photographs of Joseph Macerollo and his Giulietti Bassetti Accordion in 1963-1980

- Macerollo, Joseph (1970), "The Unexplained Instrument", Mcan
- Macerollo, Joseph (1970), "The Accordion In Transition", JMChronicle
- Macerollo, Joseph (1971), "Musicians Once Laughed at the Accordion", Canadian Music Teacher
- Macerollo, Joseph (1974), "Not Another New Music Group", Recorder
- Macerollo, Joseph (1979), Students Guide to the Accordion, Agincourt
- Macerollo, Joseph (1980), Accordion Resource Manual, Avondale Press

=== See also ===
Accordion in music
Free-bass system

=== External links ===
- Joseph Macerollo on Google Books
- Joseph Macerollo on World Cat
- Joseph Macerollo on JSTOR.Org
- Joseph Macerollo | The Canadian Encyclopedia
- The Magical Joseph Macerollo
- Mr. Joseph Macerollo
