= Ksenija Sidorova =

Latvian accordionist

Ksenija Sidorova (born on 18 May 1988 in Riga) is a Latvian accordionist.

She has released music under the record labels Deutsche Grammophon and Alpha Classics. Her first album on Deutsche Grammophon, Carmen, is a recreation of Georges Bizet's Carmen for accordion that incorporates Latin, Asian, European and North American musical styles.

== Music ==
Sidorova's repertoire consists of music from Bach and Mozart up to and including contemporary works. She particularly enjoys introducing audiences to lesser-known works from eastern Europe, though tango also plays a large role. She constantly aims to expand her own repertoire and that of the accordion, bringing it to audiences as a serious and useful instrument free of the frivolous character sometimes ascribed to it.
