= Willard A. Palmer =

American music scholar (1917–1996)

Willard A. "Bill" Palmer (1917 – April 30, 1996) was an American music scholar, educator and composer. As an instrumentalist, he was accomplished in the accordion and piano. Palmer invented a 'quint' system which was later patented by Titano as used in their line of converter (or "quint") bass accordions.

Palmer made many written contributions to magazines for the promotion of the Piano accordion, including Accordion World. Some of the more important articles about his beliefs for improving the instrument and current style of playing have been gathered at The Classical Free-Reed, Inc. web site.
