= Owen Murray =

British musician (born 1948)

Owen Murray (born 20 February 1948), is a British accordionist and professor.

== Biography ==
Born in Edinburgh, he was educated at Haddington's College, East Lothian. In his teenage years, he slowly established himself as a classical player in the Scottish accordion scene, which was famous for such greats as Sir Jimmy Shand OBE and Prof. Hamish McTaggart. He competed in many Scottish and British accordion competitions, representing Scotland in the all-Britain senior solo competition in 1964 at the age of 16. Ultimately, he achieved second and third placed finishes in the British Virtuoso accordion championships. He went on to study with Mogens Ellegaard at The Royal Danish Conservatory of Music in Copenhagen, graduating with a Diploma in 1982. He played many recitals, both in the UK and overseas, most notably at the Citta del Castelfidardo in 2015. He has a recording entitled "On the Wings of the Wind", a composition renowned for the "windy gush" technique, achieved by depressing the air button, normally used for closing the bellow after practice. He also notably played two tracks on the recording entitled "Accordions Unlimited" in 1968. Owen is the son of Chrissie Leatham and the grandson of Peter Robertson Leatham. Chrissie Leatham was one of Scotland's greatest accordion players and teacher to many of Scotland's best known musicians including Kenny McGinty, Simon Thoumire, Phil Cunningham, Ian McPhail, Sandy Brechin, Jim Johnstone to name but a few. Peter Robertson Leatham (who released a recording entitled Melodeon Greats) was a highly acclaimed melodeon player in the 1920s. Owen Murray was also instrumental in their musical education.

Murray has been the Head of Classical Accordion at London's Royal Academy of Music since 1986.
