= Steen Pade =

Danish composer

Steen Pade (born 1956) is a Danish composer. He studied composition with Ib Nørholm, Per Nørgård, and Karl Aage Rasmussen.

From 1992 to 2007 he was director (principal) of the Royal Danish Academy of Music.
