= Luís Tinoco (composer) =

Portuguese composer (born 1969)

Luís Tinoco is a Portuguese composer known for works including the operas Evil Machines (2008) and Paint Me (2010), and the cantata Wanderings of the Solitary Dreamer (2011). He was born in Portugal on 16 July 1969.

== Career ==
Tinoco studied at the Escola Superior de Música de Lisboa, the Royal Academy of Music in London, and latterly the University of York, where he completed his PhD in composition. From 2000 he has worked as a freelance composer. He also authors and produces new music radio programmes for Antena 2 / RTP.

Tinoco lectures at his alma mater in Lisbon.

== Compositions ==
Tinoco's compositions include the stage works Evil Machines (2008), a music theatre project with libretto and stage direction by the former Monty Python Terry Jones, and the chamber opera Paint Me (2010), the setting of a libretto by Stephen Plaice.

A cantata, Wanderings of the Solitary Dreamer (2011), uses text by Almeida Faria.

Orchestral works were commissioned by Radio France and the Seattle Symphony.

Tinoco's music is published by the University of York Music Press.

== Discography ==
A range of Tinoco's work including chamber music has been made available on several CDs. In June 2013 Naxos released a world première recording of four orchestral/vocal works: Round Time, From the Depth of Distance, Search Songs, and Songs From The Solitary Dreamer, performed by the Gulbenkian Orchestra under the baton of David Alan Miller, with sopranos Ana Quintans, Yeree Suh and Raquel Camarinha.
