= Confédération internationale des accordéonistes =

International music association

- Abbreviation: CIA
- Formation: 1935
- Founded at: Paris
- Headquarters: Ikaalinen
- President: Mirco Patarini
- Website: www.Accordions.com/CIA
- Formerly called: Association Internationale des Accordéonistes

The Confédération internationale des accordéonistes (CIA) is an international music association of accordion players. It was originally founded in Paris in 1935 as the Association Internationale des Accordéonistes by the countries of France, Germany, and Switzerland. Later it was re-formed as the CIA in Lausanne, Switzerland in May 1948. It is currently headquartered in Ikaalinen, Finland. The CIA has been a member of the International Music Council since 1975.

The CIA organizes World Accordion Day each May 6, including programming and live-streamed performances.

== Coupe Mondiale ==
In accordance with its goal to uplift the accordion as a serious music instrument, the organization began a World Accordion Festival where players were nominated to compete for the "Coupe Mondiale" award. In 1961 the awards were expanded to include Gold, Silver, and Bronze medals for a variety of categories.

The event is hosted annually in various host country locations. It attracts musicians from all over the world, who are nominated by their resident country's member organizations.
