= Stradella bass system =

Buttonboard layout on accordions

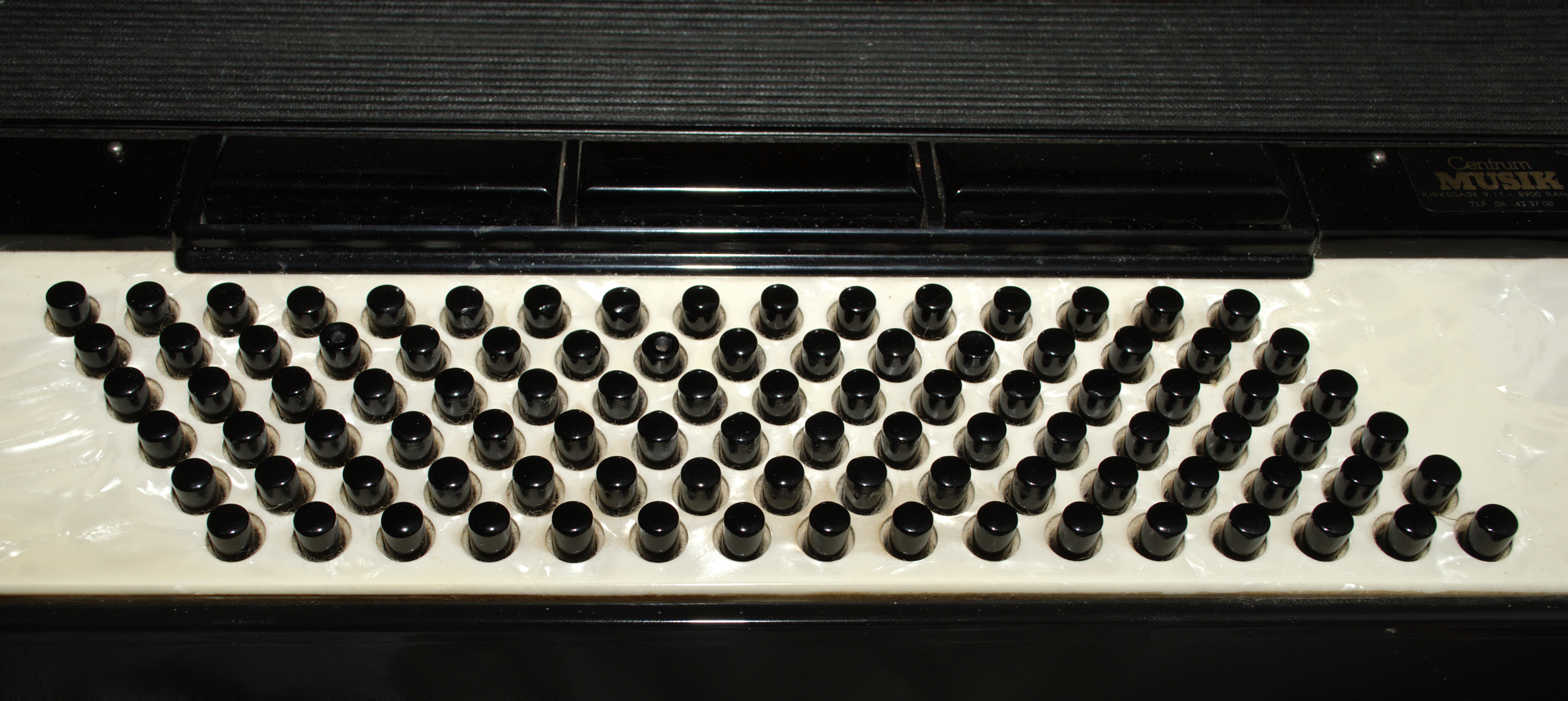
96-button Stradella bass layout on an accordion. C is in the middle of the root note row.

The Stradella Bass System (sometimes called standard bass) is a buttonboard layout equipped on the bass side of many accordions, which uses columns of buttons arranged in a circle of fifths; this places the principal major chords of a key (I, IV and V) in three adjacent columns.

== Etymology ==
The name is from Stradella, a town and commune of the Oltrepò Pavese in the Province of Pavia in the northern Italian region of Lombardy, once an important center for the production of accordions.

== Layout ==
This chart shows a common 120-button Stradella layout.

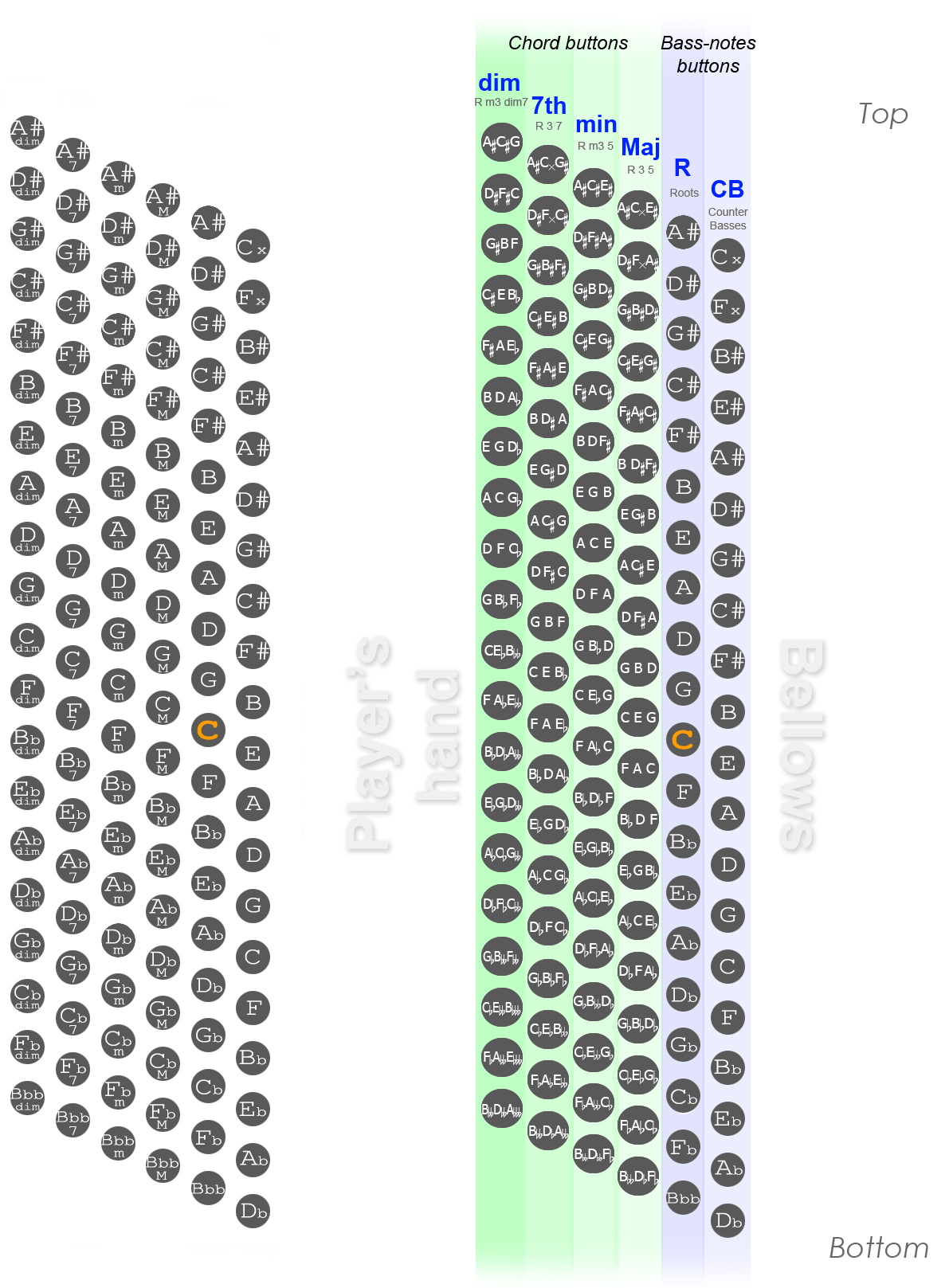
120 Bass Accordion Chart: Stradella 120-button layout. Originally published on accordionchords.com. CC BY-SA 4.0

Each bass note, and each pitch in a chord, is usually sounded simultaneously in multiple octaves. Larger accordions offer some control over the voicing with register switches.

In modern accordions, each chord button sounds three individual pitches. Early accordions sounded four pitches for the seventh and diminished chords. Modern Stradella systems omit the 5th from these two chords, allowing for more versatility. For example, an augmented seventh chord can be created by using the dominant seventh chord button and adding an augmented 5th from the right-hand manual or from one of the bass or counterbass buttons.

In most Russian layouts the diminished seventh chord row is moved by one button (so, for example, the C diminished seventh chord is where the F diminished seventh would be in a standard Stradella layout), so it is more easily reached with the forefinger.

As the buttons are on the front face and cannot be seen by the player, a small depression, hole or bump is made on the central C button in the root row, as well as on other selected root-bass buttons, such as the A♭ and E, which are four buttons away in either direction.

== Notation ==
In staff notation written for Stradella bass, notes below the center of the bass-clef staff are bass notes, and notes above the center of the staff usually indicate chord buttons. The first instance of a chord is labeled M, m, 7, or D (or d, or dim) to a signify major, minor, dominant seventh or diminished seventh, with the label applying to subsequent similar chords, until a different type of chord occurs or a new system (line) of music begins.

Within this convention, the written octave for bass and chord notes is arbitrary. The Stradella system does not have buttons for higher and lower octaves. Different accordions contain sets of reeds in different octaves, which may also be activated or muted by the accordion's register switches. For example:

As written:

As sounded, with one possible octave voicing:

Bass notes to be played on the major third (counterbass) row are often indicated by repurposed "tenuto" lines below the notes (as in the E bass note in the example above), or underlined note names or numbers.

Single-note bass lines are often labeled "B.S." (bass solo or bassi soli), especially when they extend above the middle of the staff.

== Fingering ==
As with the piano, fingers are numbered 2 to 5, starting with the index finger, mirroring right-hand fingering. As a rule, the thumb, numbered 1, is not used.

Patterns can be played identically in any desired key, changing only the starting position. This is because, unlike a piano keyboard, the Stradella layout is isomorphic—meaning that a given sequence/combination of notes is played with the same relative finger positions and motions in any key. Layouts with 16 or more columns are sufficient to play in any of the 12 keys of the circle of fifths.

=== Bass and chords ===
4–3 is a recommended fingering for a bass note and its corresponding major chord (e.g. C–CM–C–CM). For alternate bass with the root and fifth, 4–3–2–3 can be used for major chords (e.g. C–CM–G–CM), 4–2–3–2 for minor and other types of chords (e.g. C–C7–G–C7).

=== Scales ===
Scales, runs, and other bass lines are played on the bass note buttons, the row or rows closest to the bellows (root row, optional thirds row, optional minor thirds row).

==== Major scales ====
The major scale can be fingered without stretching the hand, playing in any key as r4 r2 t4 r5 / r3 t5 t3 r4 (r = root row, t = thirds row) or, with minimal movement of the index finger, r3 r2 t3 r4 / r2 t4 t2 r3.

==== Minor scales ====
A recommended fingering for harmonic minor:

Melodic minor (different ascending and descending):

== Register switches ==
Larger and more expensive accordions may have as many as nine register switches on the bass side, controlling which reed ranks play and thus the octaves and voicing of the bass notes and chords, similar in concept to the treble register switches on the keyboard side. Smaller or simpler accordions may have no bass switches, or a single switch that toggles two settings.

Bass register switches and reed sets of a typical professional-grade accordion
Register switch		Reed sets				
Register switch		Soprano; C_{5}–B_{5}	Alto; C_{4}–B_{4}	Contralto; F♯_{3}–F_{4}	Tenor; C_{3}–B_{3}	Bass; C_{2}–B_{2}
Name	Symbol	(chords and bass notes)			(bass notes only)	
soprano		Yes				
alto		Yes	Yes			
tenor		Yes	Yes		Yes	
soft tenor			Yes		Yes	
master or bass forte		Yes	Yes	Yes	Yes	Yes
soft bass or bass piano				Yes	Yes	Yes
bass/alto		Yes	Yes			Yes

With the soprano or alto register selected, bass buttons exactly duplicate individual notes from the chords, without the usual added lower (tenor and bass) octaves.

An accordion with one or two register switches on the bass side might provide tenor and master registers, while accordions with additional switches might have larger subsets.

== Common configurations ==
Name	Columns	Rows of bass notes	Rows of chords
8-bass	4 – Root notes: F to D	Root note	Major
12-bass	6 – Root notes: B♭ to A	Root note	Major
24-bass	8 – Root notes: E♭ to E	Root note	Major, minor
32-bass	8 – Root notes: E♭ to E	Root note	Major, minor, 7th
40-bass	8 – Root notes: E♭ to E	Major 3rd note, root note	Major, minor, 7th
48-bass 8x6	8 – Root notes: E♭ to E	Major 3rd note, root note	Major, minor, 7th, diminished
48-bass 12x4	12 – Root notes: D♭ to F♯	Major 3rd note, root note	Major, minor
60-bass	12 – Root notes: D♭ to F♯	Major 3rd note, root note	Major, minor, 7th
72-bass	12 – Root notes: D♭ to F♯	Major 3rd note, root note	Major, minor, 7th, diminished
80-bass	16 – Root notes: C♭ to G♯	Major 3rd note, root note	Major, minor, 7th
96-bass	16 – Root notes: C♭ to G♯	Major 3rd note, root note	Major, minor, 7th, diminished
100-bass	20 – Root notes: B (Note: B is often referred to as "low A"; enharmonic equivalents play the same reeds.) to A♯	Major 3rd note, root note	Major, minor, 7th
120-bass	20 – Root notes: B to A♯	Major 3rd note, root note	Major, minor, 7th, diminished
120-bass	20 – Root notes: B to A♯	Minor 3rd, major 3rd, root note	Major, minor, 7th
140-bass	20 – Root notes: B to A♯	Major 3rd note, root note	Major, minor, 7th, diminished, augmented (Note: 140-bass accordions may come with either an extra minor 3rd note row, located above the regular major 3rd row and the root note, or an augmented 7th chord row.)
140-bass	20 – Root notes: B to A♯	Minor 3rd note, major 3rd note, root note	Major, minor, 7th, diminished
160-bass	20 – Root notes: B to A♯	Minor 3rd row, Major 3rd row, root note	Major, minor, 7th, diminished, augmented

Versions with 25 columns of buttons, such as on the Russian Tula Bayan, also exist, ranging from E to C, which can play the same reeds, despite there being accordions that can play lower than E1, and potentially as low as C1.

== See also ==
- Array system, same circle of fifths system for an mbira
- Alternate bass
- Free-bass system
