= Ole Schmidt =

Danish conductor (1928–2010)

Ole Schmidt Pedersen (14 July 1928 – 6 March 2010) was a Danish composer and conductor.

== Biography ==
Born in Copenhagen, Schmidt was self-taught, before studying composition at the Royal Danish Academy of Music. He came to public notice after composing three ballets in quick succession in the 1950s, after which he became conductor at the Royal Danish Theatre. He then held posts at the Hamburg Symphony Orchestra, the Danish Radio Sinfonietta, and the Aarhus Symphony Orchestra. He also held guest conductor appointments at the Royal Northern College of Music and the Toledo Symphony Orchestra.

He was particularly well known for his recordings of the music of Carl Nielsen, including a cycle of Nielsen's six symphonies with the London Symphony Orchestra, which won the Nielsen Prize in 1975.
