= Accordion =

Bellows-driven free-reed aerophone musical instrument

- A piano accordion (top) and a chromatic button accordion (bottom)

Keyboard instrument
- Hornbostel–Sachs classification: 412.132 (Free reed aerophone)
- Developed: Early 19th century

Playing range
- Depends on configuration: Right-hand keyboard: Chromatic button accordion; Diatonic button accordion; Piano accordion; Left-hand keyboard: Stradella bass system; Free-bass system

Related instruments
- Hand-pumped: Bandoneon, concertina, flutina, garmon, trikitixa, Indian harmonium, harmoneon Foot-pumped: Harmonium Mouth-blown: Claviola, melodica, harmonica, Laotian khene, Chinese shēng, Japanese shō Electronic reedless instruments: Digital accordion, Electronium

Musicians
- Accordionists (list of accordionists).

More articles or information
- Accordion, Chromatic button accordion, Bayan, Diatonic button accordion, Piano accordion, Stradella bass system, Free-bass system, Accordion reed ranks and switches

Accordions (from 19th-century German Akkordeon, from Akkord—"musical chord, concord of sounds") are a family of box-shaped musical instruments of the bellows-driven free reed aerophone type (producing sound as air flows past a reed in a frame). The essential characteristic of the accordion is to combine in one instrument a melody section, also called the diskant, usually on the right-hand keyboard, with an accompaniment or basso continuo functionality on the left-hand. The musician normally plays the melody on buttons or keys on the right-hand side (referred to as the keyboard or sometimes the manual), and the accompaniment on bass or pre-set chord buttons on the left-hand side. A person who plays the accordion is called an accordionist.

The accordion belongs to the free-reed aerophone family. Other instruments in this family include the concertina, harmonica, and bandoneon. The concertina and bandoneon do not have the melody–accompaniment duality. The harmoneon is also related and, while having the descant vs. melody dualism, tries to make it less pronounced. The harmonium and American reed organ are in the same family, but are typically larger than an accordion and sit on a surface or the floor.

The accordion is played by compressing or expanding the bellows while pressing buttons or keys, causing pallets to open, which allow air to flow across strips of brass or steel, called reeds. These vibrate to produce sound inside the body. Valves on opposing reeds of each note are used to make the instrument's reeds sound louder without air leaking from each reed block. (Note: For the accordion's place among the families of musical instruments, see Henry Doktorski's Taxonomy of Musical Instruments (The Classical Free-Reed, Inc.) Also on this page is Diarmuid Pigott's The Free-Reed Family of Aerophones)

The accordion is widely spread across the world because of the waves of migration from Europe to the Americas and other regions. In some countries (for example: Argentina, Brazil, Colombia, the Dominican Republic, Mexico, and Panama) it is used in popular music (for example: Chamamé in Argentina; gaucho, forró, and sertanejo in Brazil; vallenato in Colombia; merengue in the Dominican Republic; and norteño in Mexico), whereas in other regions (such as Europe, North America, and other countries in South America) it tends to be more used for dance-pop and folk music.

In Europe and North America, some popular music acts also make use of the instrument. Additionally, the accordion is used in cajun, zydeco, jazz, and klezmer music, and in both solo and orchestral performances of classical music. Many conservatories in Europe have classical accordion departments.

== Original name ==
The oldest name for this group of instruments is harmonika, from the Ancient Greek: ἁρμονικός harmonikós meaning "harmonic, musical".

Today, native versions of the name accordion are more common. These names refer to the type of accordion patented by Cyrill Demian, which concerned "automatically coupled chords on the bass side".

== History ==
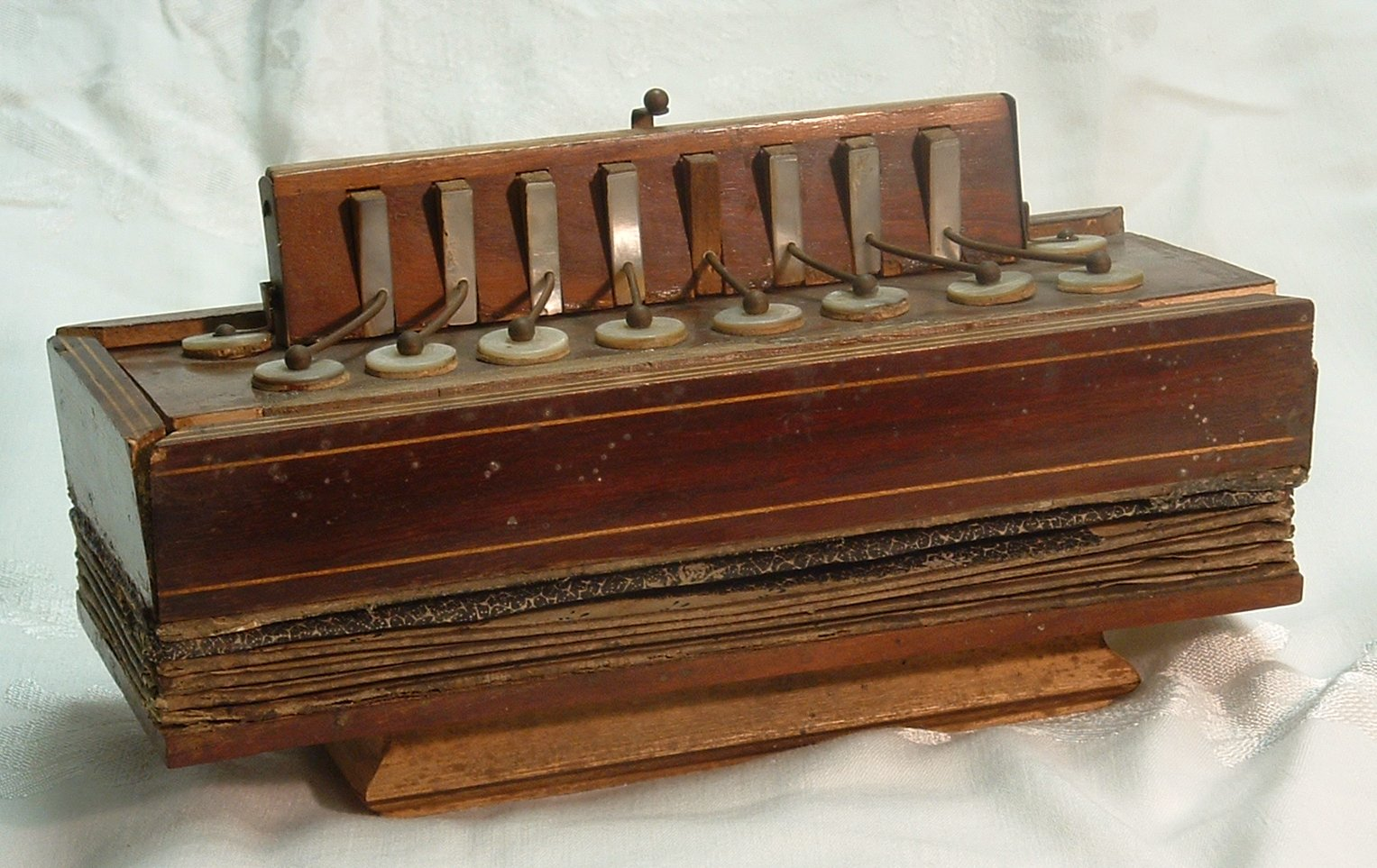
Eight-key bisonoric diatonic accordion (c. 1830)

The accordion's basic form is believed to have been invented in Berlin, in 1822, by Christian Friedrich Ludwig Buschmann, (Note: There is not a single document to back up this belief. Christian Friedrich Ludwig Buschmann was 16 years old at that time; handwritten evidence of C.F. Buschschmann and his father exists, but without any related notice within. The first mention of an aeoline was in a text dated 1829.) although one instrument was discovered in 2006 that appears to have been built earlier. (Note: This is the accordion owned by Fredrik Dillner of Sweden, which has the name F. Löhner Nürnberg engraved (stamped) on it. The instrument was given to Johannes Dillner in 1830 or earlier)

The accordion is one of several European inventions of the early 19th century that use free reeds driven by a bellows. An instrument called accordion was first patented in 1829 by Cyrill Demian in Vienna. (Note: A summary and pictures of this patent can be found at (The Classical Free-Reed, Inc.))

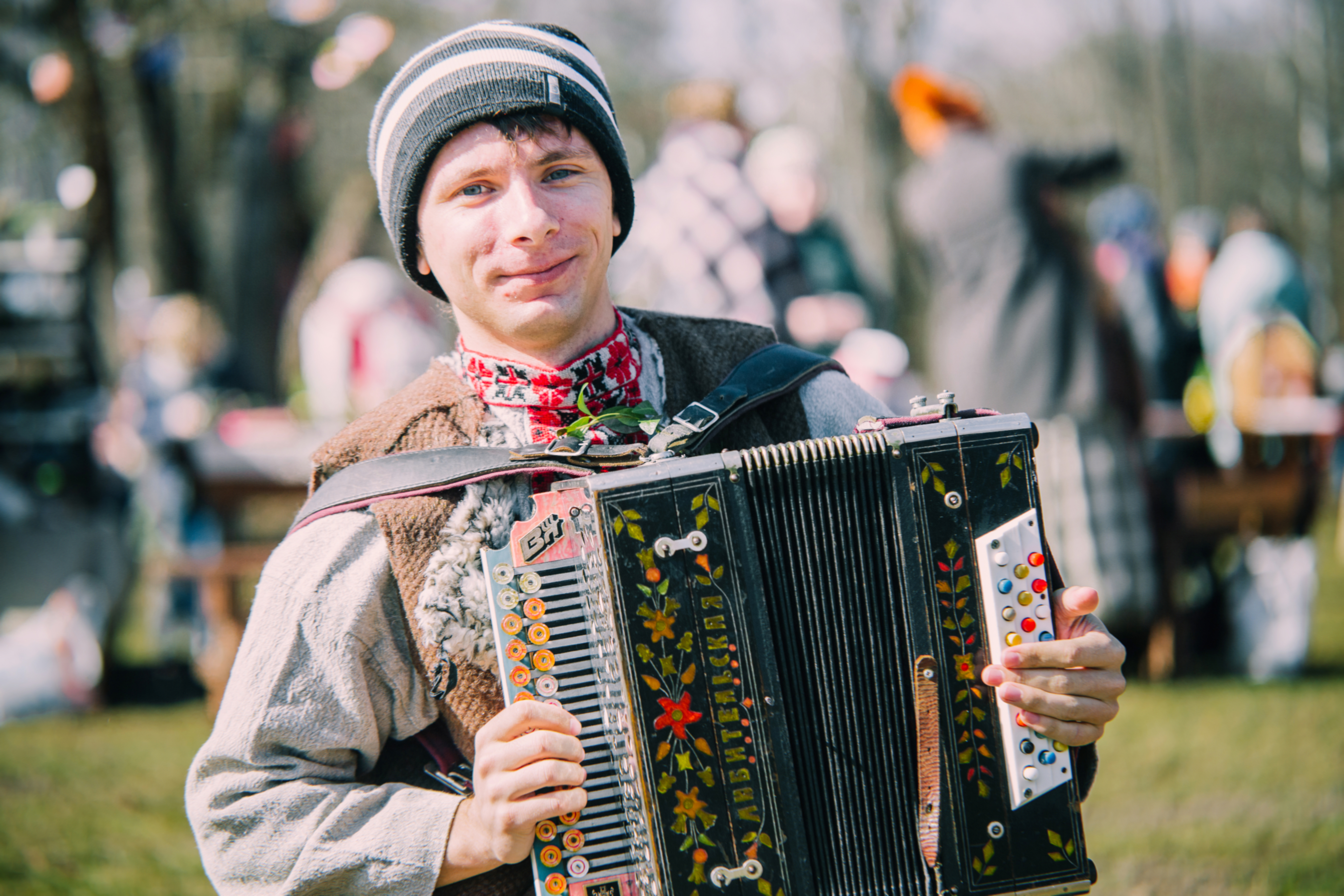
An accordionist

Cyrill Demian's instrument bore little resemblance to modern instruments. It only had a left-hand buttonboard, with the right hand simply operating the bellows. One key feature for which Demian sought the patent was the sounding of an entire chord by depressing one key. His instrument could also sound two chords with the same key, one for each bellow direction (a bisonoric action). At that time in Vienna, mouth harmonicas with Kanzellen (chambers) had already been available for many years, along with bigger instruments driven by hand bellows. The diatonic key arrangement was also already used on mouth-blown instruments. Demian's patent thus covered an accompanying instrument: an accordion played with the left hand, opposite to how contemporary chromatic hand harmonicas were played, small and light enough for travelers to take with them and used to accompany singing. The patent also described instruments with both bass and treble sections, although Demian preferred the bass-only instrument owing to its cost and weight advantages. (Note: German Text: "Mit den Dekel des Balges, läßt sich das ganze Instrument verdoppeln, so daß man dadurch die Accorde vermehrt, oder auch mit einzelne Töne spielen kann, in diesem Fall, muß ein zweyter Einsatz mit Federn, und auch eine 2te Claviatur dazu kommen, der Blasebalg bleibt in der Mitte, jede Hand dirigirt abwechselnd, entweder die Claves, oder den Balg. Durch eine obengenannte Verdoplung des Instruments oder durch Vermehrung der Accorde, würde niemand etwas verbessern, oder was neues liefern, weil nur die Bestandtheile dadurch vermehrt, das Instrument theurer und schwerer wird." Translation of this snip: With the Cover of the bellows the instrument can be duplicated, so the number of Chords or single notes can be enlarged, or one can sound single notes, in this case, a second part with springs (free reeds) and also a second keyboard must be added, the bellows are in between these two parts, both hands push buttons and push and pull the bellows at the same time or alternatively. Through this doubling or increasing of chords within the instrument nothing new is invented or improved by someone else, because only the amount of similar parts is increased and the Instrument is heavier and more expensive.German full text)

The accordion was introduced from Germany into Britain in about the year 1828. The instrument was noted in The Times in 1831 as one new to British audiences and was not favourably reviewed, but nevertheless it soon became popular. It had also become popular with New Yorkers by the mid-1840s.

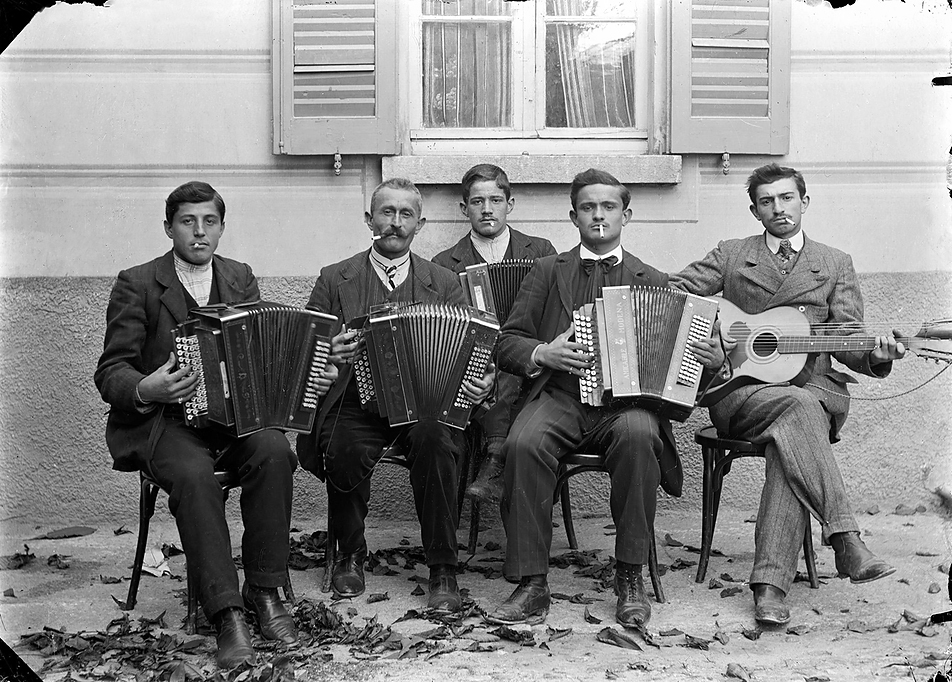
A group of accordionists in Ticino (early 20th century)

The earliest history of the accordion in Russia is poorly documented. Nevertheless, according to Russian researchers, the earliest known simple accordions were made in Tula, Russia, by Ivan Sizov and Timofey Vorontsov around 1830, after they received an early accordion from Germany. By the late 1840s, the instrument was already very widespread. Together the factories of the two masters were producing 10,000 instruments a year. By 1866, over 50,000 instruments were being produced yearly by Tula and neighbouring villages, and by 1874 the yearly production was over 700,000. By the 1860s, Novgorod, Vyatka and Saratov governorates also had significant accordion production. By the 1880s, the list included Oryol, Ryazan, Moscow, Tver, Vologda, Kostroma, Nizhny Novgorod and Simbirsk, and many of these places created their own varieties of the instrument.

After Demian's invention, other accordions appeared, some featuring only the right-handed keyboard for playing melodies. It took English inventor Charles Wheatstone to bring both chords and keyboard together in one squeezebox. His 1844 patent for what he called a concertina also featured the ability to easily tune the reeds from the outside with a simple tool.

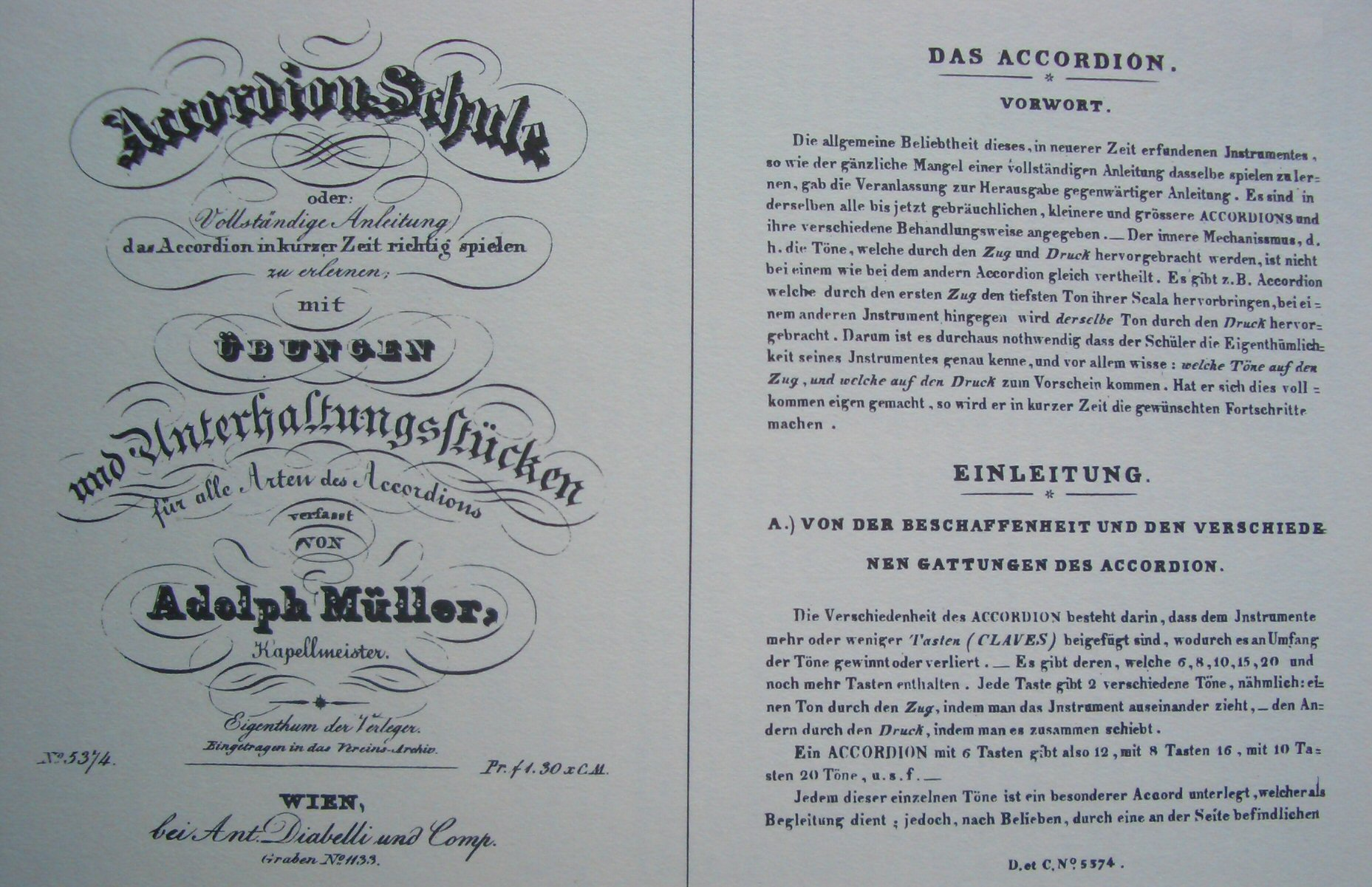
The first pages in Adolf Müller's accordion book

The Austrian musician Adolf Müller described a great variety of instruments in his 1854 book Schule für Accordion. At the time, Vienna and London had a close musical relationship, with musicians often performing in both cities in the same year, so it is possible that Wheatstone was aware of this type of instrument and may have used them to put his key-arrangement ideas into practice.

A Soviet-era "Малыш" piano accordion

Jeune's flutina resembles Wheatstone's concertina in internal construction and tone colour, but it appears to complement Demian's accordion functionally. The flutina is a one-sided bisonoric melody-only instrument whose keys are operated with the right hand while the bellows are operated with the left. When the two instruments are combined, the result is quite similar to diatonic button accordions still manufactured today.

Further innovations followed and continue to the present. Various buttonboard and keyboard systems have been developed, as well as voicings (the combination of multiple tones at different octaves), with mechanisms to switch between different voices during performance, and different methods of internal construction to improve tone, stability, and durability. Modern accordions may incorporate electronics such as condenser microphones and tone and volume controls so that the accordion can be plugged into a PA system or keyboard amplifier for live shows. Some 2010s-era accordions may incorporate MIDI sensors and circuitry, enabling the accordion to be plugged into a synth module and produce accordion sounds or other synthesized instrument sounds, such as piano or organ.

== Construction ==
A diatonic button accordion being played

Accordions have many configurations and types. What may be easy to do with one type of accordion could be technically challenging or impossible with another, and proficiency with one layout may not translate to another.

The most obvious difference between accordions is their right-hand sides. Piano accordions use a piano-style musical keyboard; button accordions use a buttonboard. Button accordions are furthermore differentiated by their usage of a chromatic or diatonic buttonboard for the right-hand side.

Accordions may be either bisonoric, producing different pitches depending on the direction of bellows movement, or unisonoric, producing the same pitch in both directions. Piano accordions are unisonoric. Chromatic button accordions also tend to be unisonoric, while diatonic button accordions tend to be bisonoric, though notable exceptions exist.

Accordion size is not standardized, and may vary significantly from model to model. Accordions vary not only in their dimensions and weight, but also in the number of buttons or keys present in the right- and left-hand keyboards. For example, piano accordions may have as few as 8 bass buttons (two rows of four), or up to 140 (seven rows of twenty) or beyond. Accordions also vary by their available registers and by their specific tuning and voicing.

Despite these differences, all accordions share several common components.

=== Universal components ===
==== Bellows ====
Accordion bellows controlled sounds
A sample of effects that can be achieved with the bellows—949 KB

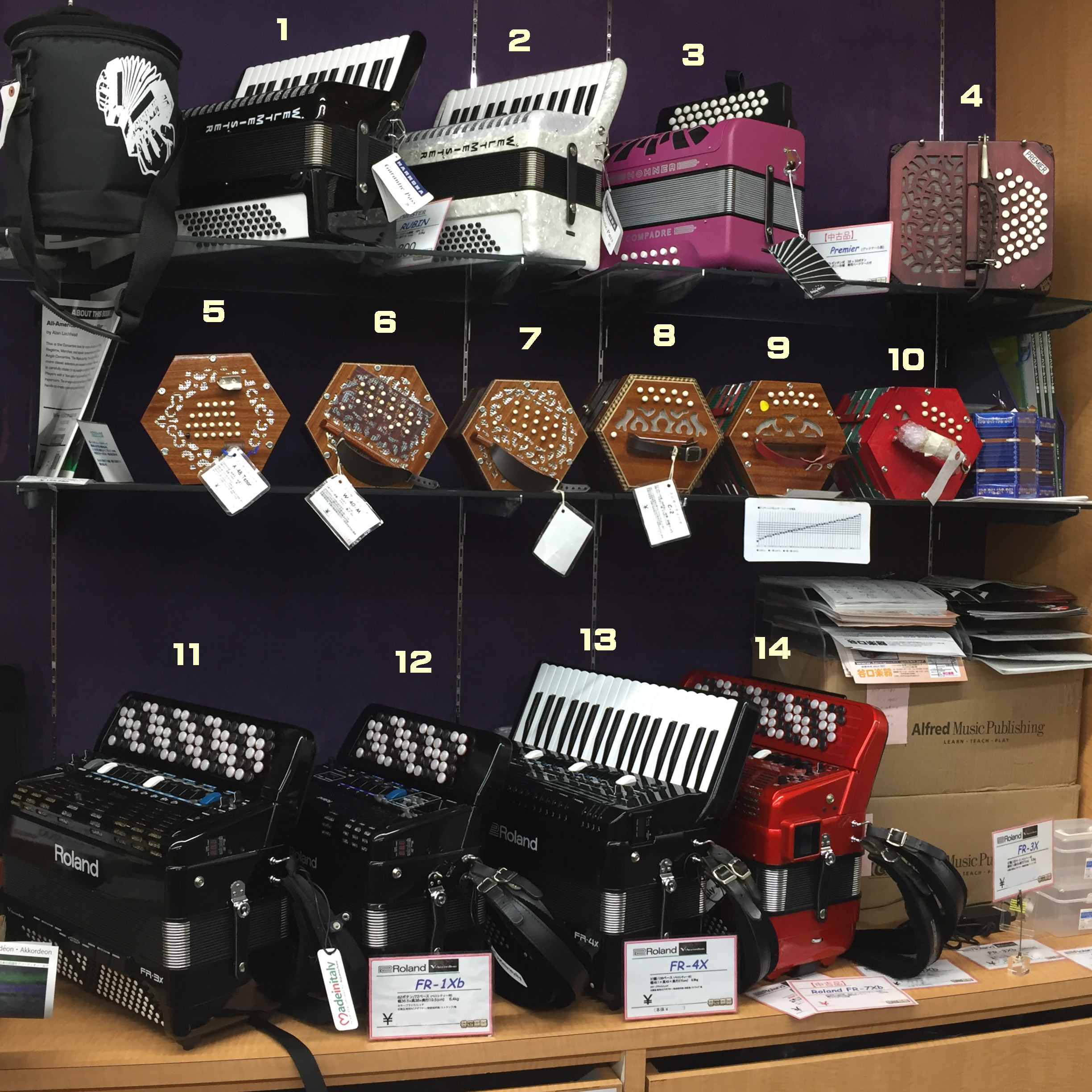
Bellows-driven instruments: Piano accordions: 1, 2, 13; Diatonic button accordion: 3; Chromatic button accordions: 11, 12, 14; Digital accordions (V-Accordions, Roland Corporation): 11, 12, 13, 14; Bandoneon: 4; English concertina: 5; Anglo-German concertinas (Anglo concertinas): 6, 7, 8, 9, 10

The bellows is the most recognizable part of the instrument, and the primary means of articulation. The production of sound in an accordion is in direct proportion to the motion of the bellows by the player. In a sense, the role of the bellows can be compared to the role of moving a violin's bow on bowed strings. For a more direct analogy, the bellows can be compared to the role of breathing for a singer. The bellows is located between the right- and left-hand keyboards, and is made from pleated layers of cloth and cardboard, with added leather and metal. It is used to create pressure and vacuum, driving air across the internal reeds and producing sound by their vibrations, applied pressure increases the volume.

The keyboard touch is not expressive and does not affect dynamics: all expression is effected through the bellows. Bellows effects include:

- Volume control, including swells and fades
- Repeated short, rapid changes of direction ("bellows shake"), which has been popularized by musicians such as Renato Borghetti (gaucho music) and Luiz Gonzaga, and extensively used in Forró, called resfulego in Brazil
- Constant bellows motion while applying pressure at intervals
- Constant bellows motion to produce clear tones with no resonance
- Subtly changing the intonation to mimic the expressiveness of a singer
- Using the bellows with the silent air button gives the sound of air moving ("whooshing"), which is sometimes used in contemporary compositions for this instrument

==== Body ====
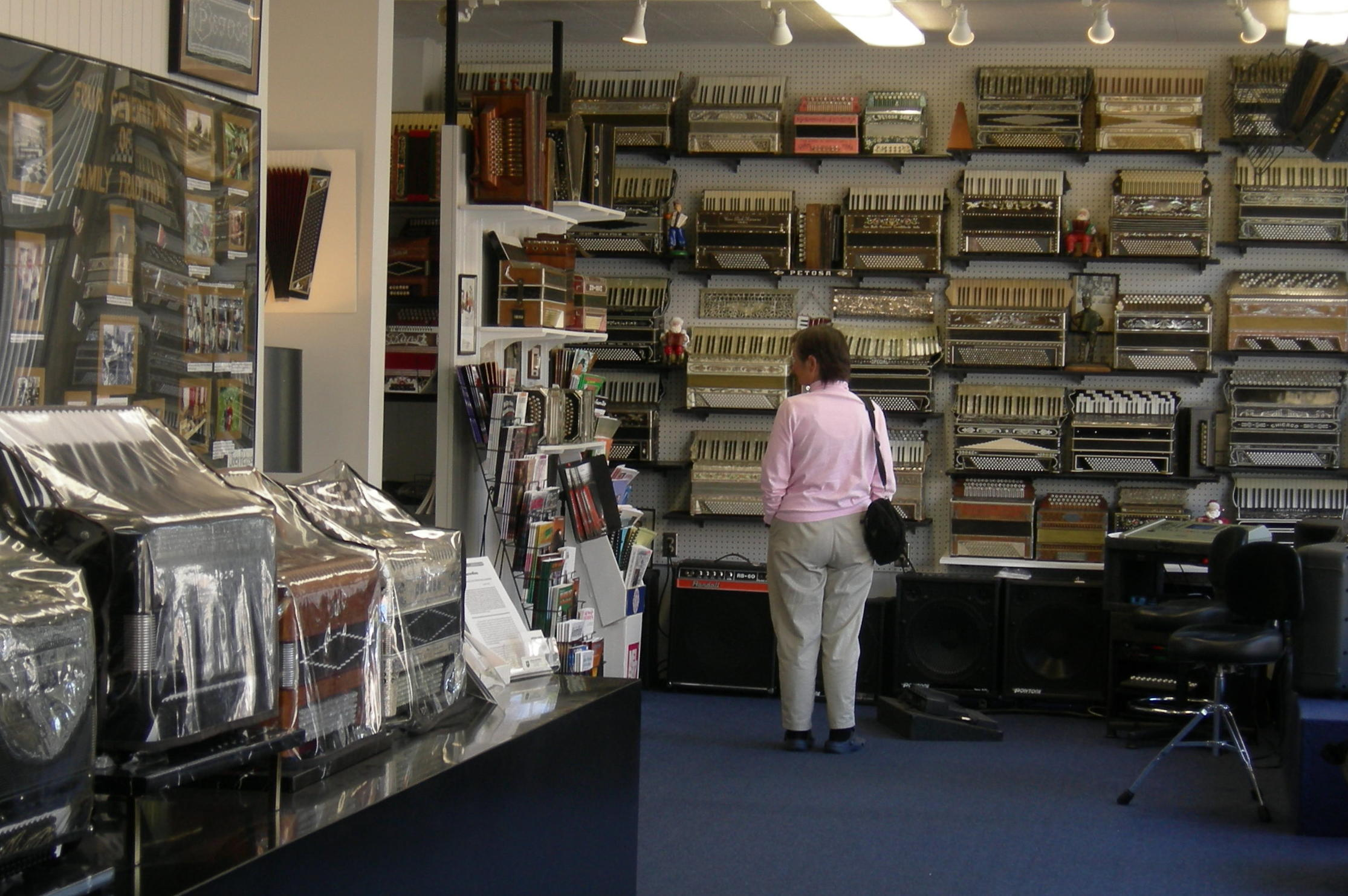
Showroom of accordions (Petosa Accordions, Seattle, Washington)

The accordion's body consists of two boxes, commonly made of wood, joined by the bellows. These boxes house reed chambers for the right- and left-hand keyboards. Each side has grilles in order to facilitate the transmission of air in and out of the instrument and to allow the sound to project. The grille at the right-hand side is usually larger and is often shaped for decorative purposes. The right-hand keyboard is normally used for playing the melody and the left-hand one for playing the accompaniment; however, skilled players can reverse these roles and play melodies with the left hand. (Note: Guido Deiro claimed he was the first accordionist to play a solo with the left hand: Sharpshooter's March (1908) Guido Deiro, Guido Deiro's Own Story of Sharpshooters March, The Pietro Musicordion, Volume 6, Number 2 (May–June 1948))

The size and weight of an accordion varies depending on its type, layout and playing range, which can be as small as to have only one or two rows of basses and a single octave on the right-hand keyboard, to the most common 120-bass accordion and through to large and heavy 160-bass free-bass converter models.

==== Pallet mechanism ====
The accordion is an aerophone. The keyboard mechanisms of the instrument either enable the air flow, or disable it: (Note: Illustration made with reference from a similar illustration that can be found in both Det levende bælgspil (p. 9) by Jeanette & Lars Dyremose (2003), and Harmonikaens historie (p. 35a) by Bjarne Glenstrup (1972, The University of Copenhagen, Faculty of Music))

A side view of the pallet mechanism in a piano accordion. As the key is pressed down the pallet is lifted, allowing for air to enter the tone chamber in either direction and excite the reeds; air flow direction depends on the direction of bellows movement. A similar mechanical pallet movement is used in button accordions, as well as for bass mechanisms such as the Stradella bass machine that translates a single button press into multiple pallet openings for the notes of a chord.

=== Variable components ===
The term accordion covers a wide range of instruments, with varying components. All instruments have reed ranks of some format, apart from reedless digital accordions. Not all have switches to change registers or ranks, as some have only one treble register and one bass register. The most typical accordion is the piano accordion, which is used for many musical genres. Another type of accordion is the button accordion, which is used in musical traditions including Cajun, Conjunto and Tejano music, Swiss and Slovenian-Austro-German Alpine music, and Argentinian tango music. The Helikon-style accordion has multiple flared horns projecting out of the left side to strengthen the bass tone. The word "Helikon" refers to a deep-pitched tuba.

==== Right-hand keyboard systems ====
Different systems exist for the right-hand keyboard of an accordion, which is normally used for playing the melody (while it can also play chords). Some use a button layout arranged in one way or another, while others use a piano-style keyboard. Each system has different claimed benefits by those who prefer it. They are also used to define one accordion or another as a different "type":

- Chromatic button accordions and the bayan, a Russian variant, use a buttonboard where notes are arranged chromatically. Two major systems exist, referred to as the B-system and the C-system (there are also regional variants). Rarely, some chromatic button accordions have a decorative right-hand keyboard in addition to the rows of buttons, an approach used by the virtuoso accordionist Pietro Frosini.
- Diatonic button accordions use a buttonboard designed around the notes of diatonic scales in a small number of keys. The keys are often arranged in one row for each key available. Chromatic scales may be available by combining notes from different rows. The adjective "diatonic" is also commonly used to describe bisonic or bisonoric accordions—that is, instruments whose right-hand (and in some instances even bass) keys each sound two different notes depending on the direction of the bellows (for instance, producing major triad sequences while closing the bellows and dominant seventh or 7–9 while opening). Such is the case, for instance, with the Argentinian bandoneon, the Slovenian-Austro-German Steirische Harmonika, the Czech Heligonka Harmonika, the Italian organetto, the Swiss Schwyzerörgeli and the Anglo concertina.
- Piano accordions use a musical keyboard similar to a piano, at right angles to the cabinet, the tops of the keys inward toward the bellows.
  - The rarely used bass accordion has only a right-hand keyboard, with ranks of 8', 16', and 32' reeds, with the lowest note being the deepest pitch on a pipe organ pedal keyboard (pedal C). It is intended for performing basslines in accordion orchestras.
  - The rarely used piccolo accordion also has only a right-hand keyboard.
- 6-plus-6 accordions use a buttonboard with three rows of buttons in a "uniform" or "whole-tone" arrangement, generally known as a Jankó keyboard. The chromatic scale consists of two rows. The third row is a repetition of the first row, so there is the same fingering in all twelve scales. These accordions are produced only in special editions e.g. the logicordion produced by Harmona.
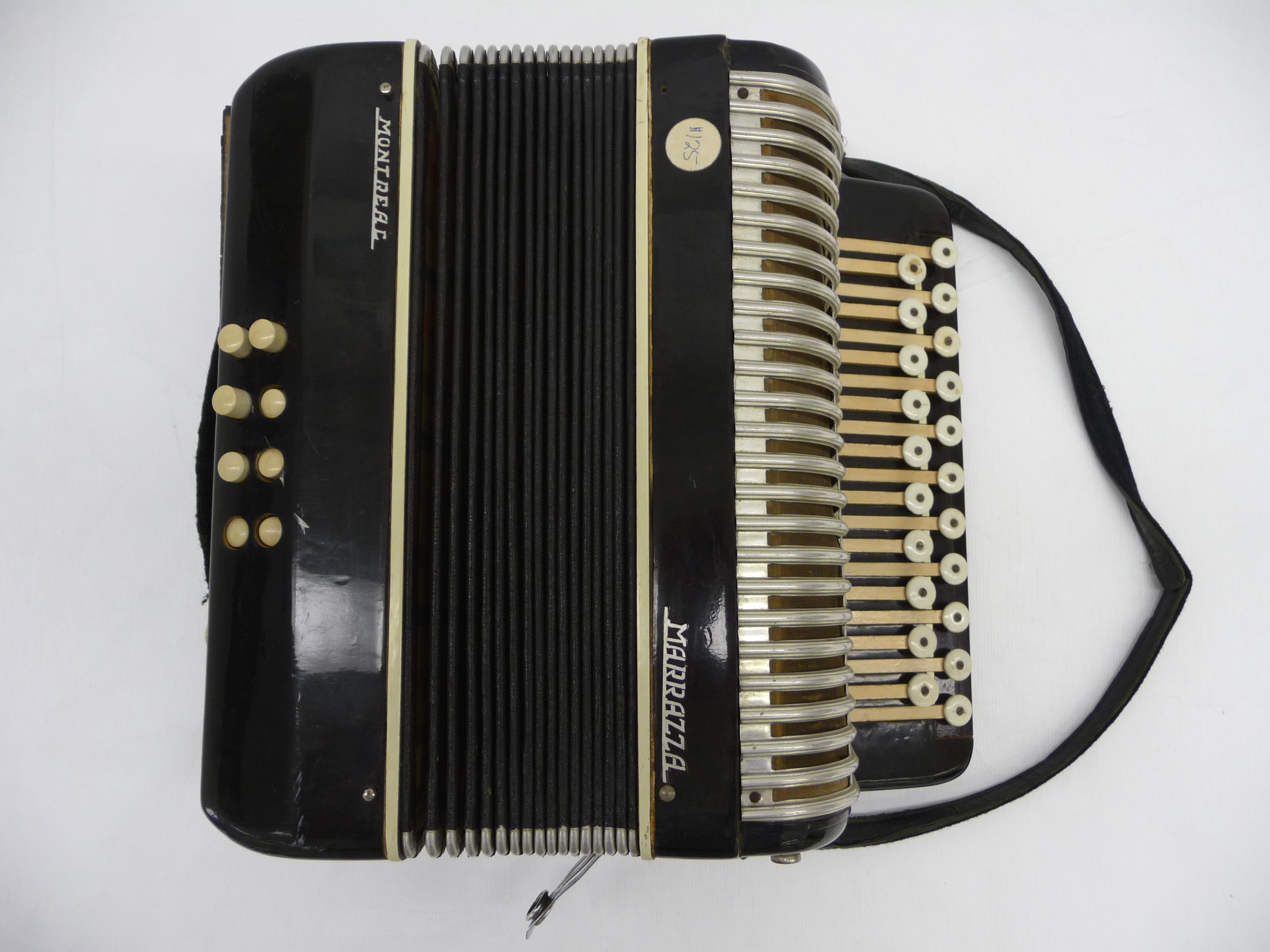
A button key accordion made by the company Marrazza in Italy. It was brought by Italian immigrants to Australia as a reminder of their homeland.

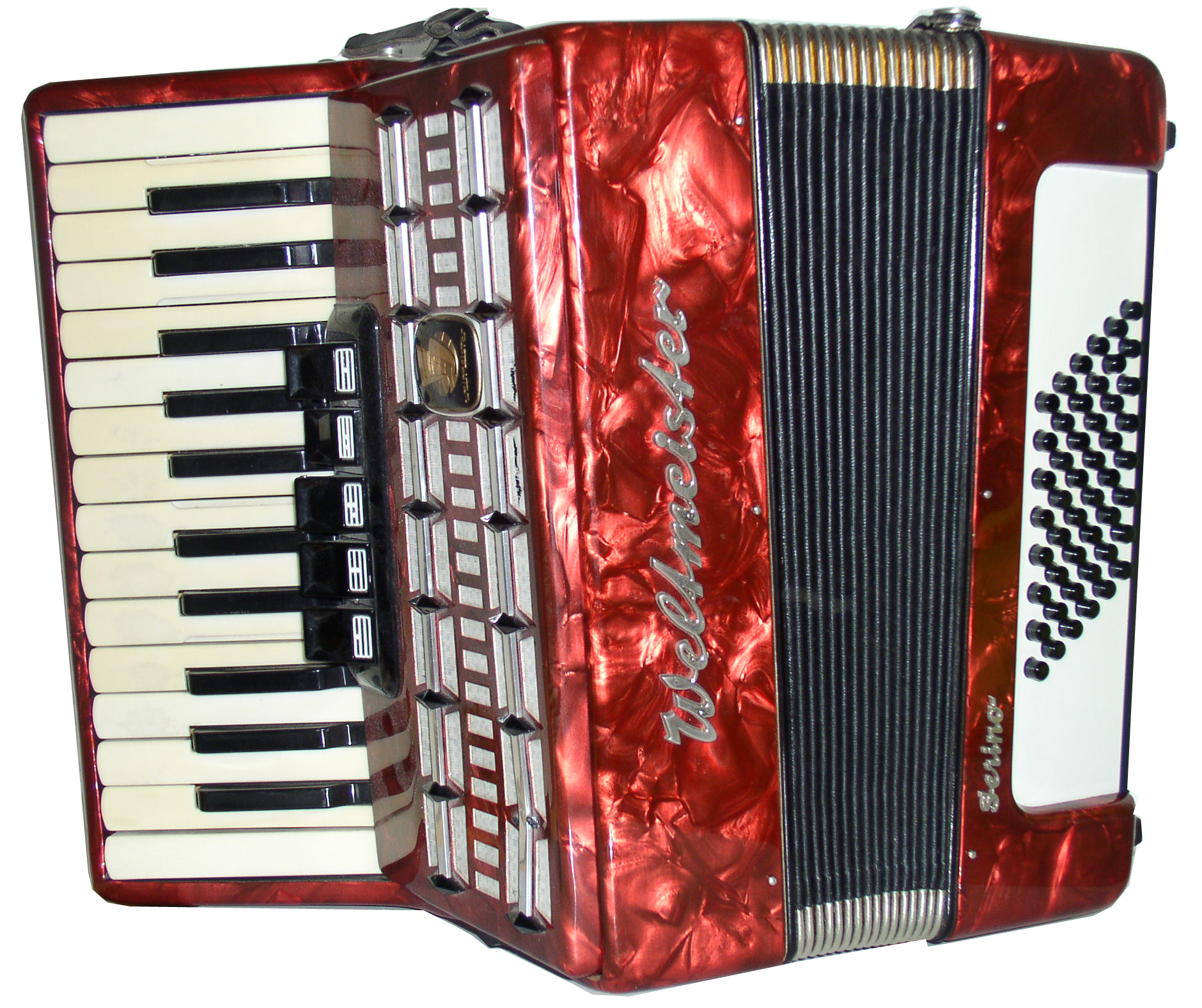
A Weltmeister piano accordion by VEB Klingenthaler Harmonikawerke

==== Left-hand keyboard systems ====
Typical 120-button Stradella bass system. This is the left-hand keyboard system found on most unisonoric accordions today.

Different systems are also in use for the left-hand keyboard, which is normally used for playing the accompaniment. These usually use distinct bass buttons and often have buttons with concavities or studs to help the player navigate the layout despite not being able to see the buttons while playing. There are three general categories:

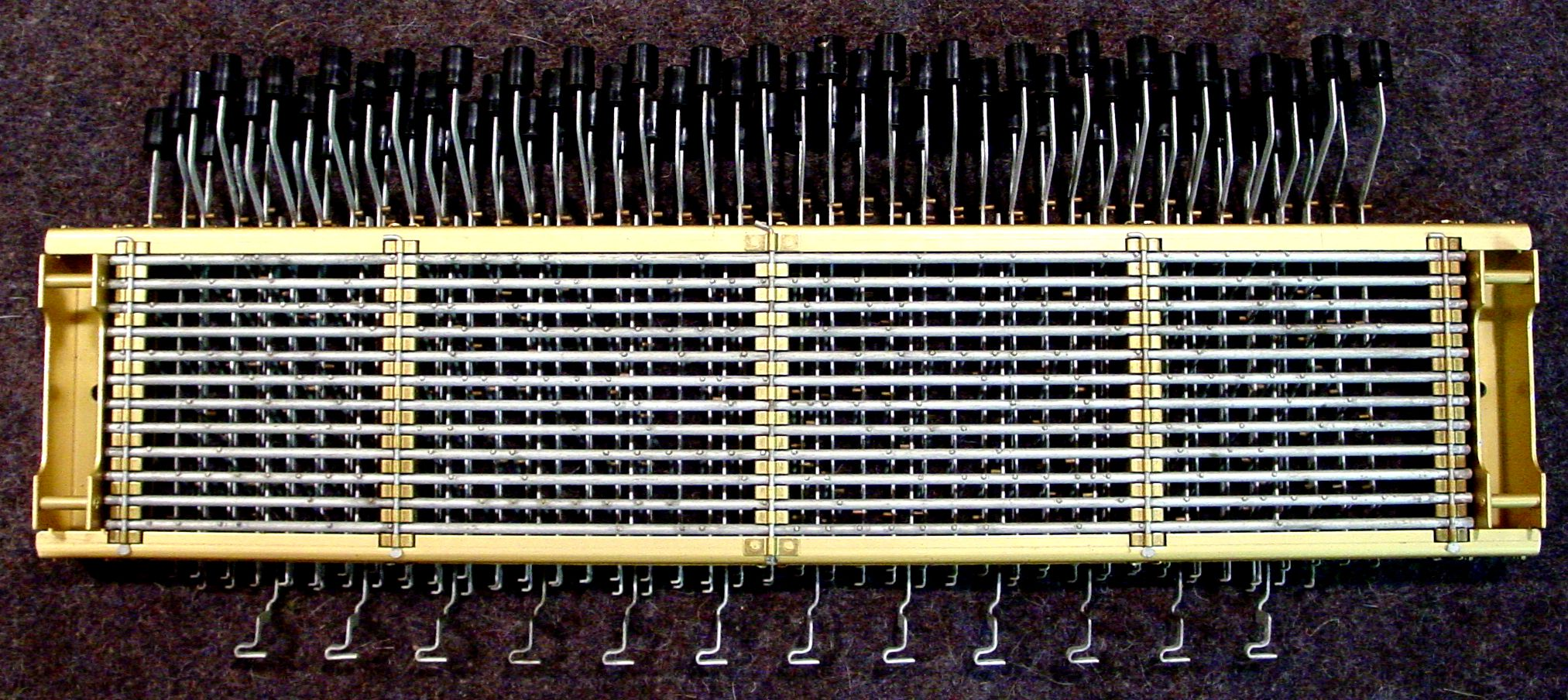
The bass buttons trigger a complex mechanism of wires, rods, and levers, which is normally hidden inside the instrument.

- The Stradella bass system, also called standard bass, is arranged in a circle of fifths and uses single buttons for bass notes and additional rows of single buttons for preset major, minor, dominant seventh, and diminished chords. The dominant seventh and diminished chords are three-note chord voicings that omit the fifths of the chords.
- The Belgian bass system is a variation used in Belgian chromatic accordions. It is also arranged in a circle of fifths but in reverse order. This system has three rows of basses, three rows of chord buttons allowing easier fingering for playing melodies, combined chords, better use of fingers one and five, and more space between the buttons. This system was rarely used outside of its native Belgium.
- Various free-bass systems for greater access to playing melodies and complex basslines on the left-hand keyboard and to forming one's own chords note-by-note. These are often chosen for playing jazz and classical music. Some models can convert between free-bass and Stradella bass; this is called converter bass. The free-bass left hand notes are arranged chromatically in three rows with one additional duplicate row of buttons.
- Luttbeg double-keyboard piano accordions have a piano keyboard layout on both the treble and bass sides. This allows pianists, most notably Duke Ellington, to double up on the accordion without difficulty. The Bercandeon is an improved version of that instrument, also making it a "keyboard bandoneon".
- In 2021, a patent was published by Valerio Chiovarelli for a new bass system called the "Chiovarelli Jazz System". This system is a variation of the Stradella bass system where, instead of triads, the chordal buttons of this system produce bichords (chords with only 2 pitches instead of 3). The "Chiovarellia Jazz System" (or "CJS" for short) prioritizes the effectiveness of left hand accordion in jazz music, hence the name of the system, but according to the inventor, these chords can be useful when playing many varieties of music.

==== Reed ranks and switches ====
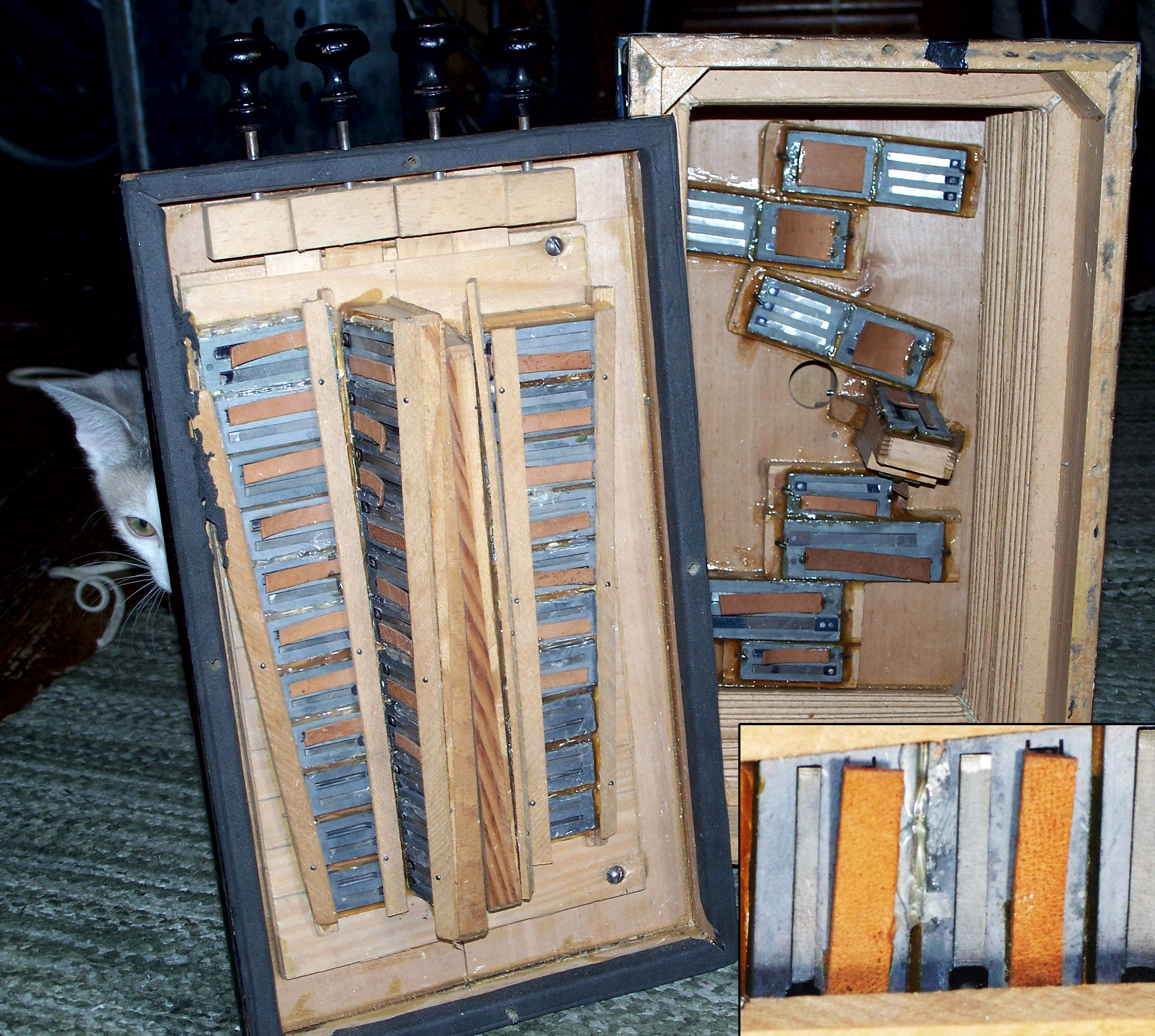
Accordion reed ranks with closeup of reeds

Inside the accordion are the reeds that generate the instrument tones. These are organized in different sounding banks, which can be further combined into registers producing differing timbres. All but the smaller accordions are equipped with switches that control which combination of reed banks operate, organized from high to low registers. Each register stop produces a separate sound timbre, many of which also differ in octaves or in how different octaves are combined. See the accordion reed ranks and switches article for further explanation and audio samples. All but the smaller accordions usually have treble switches. The larger and more expensive accordions often also have bass switches to give options for the reed bank on the bass side.

==== Classification of chromatic and piano type accordions ====
In describing or pricing an accordion, the first factor is size, expressed in number of keys on either side. For a piano type, this could for one example be 37/96, meaning 37 treble keys (three octaves plus one note) on the treble side and 96 bass keys. A second aspect of size is the width of the white keys, which means that even accordions with the same number of keys have keyboards of different lengths, ranging from 14 inches (36 cm) for a child's accordion to 19 inches (48 cm) for an adult-sized instrument. After size, the price and weight of an accordion is largely dependent on the number of reed ranks on either side, either on a cassotto or not, and to a lesser degree on the number of combinations available through register switches. The next, but important, factor is the quality of the reeds, the highest grade called "a mano" (meaning "hand-made"), the next "tipo a mano" ("like hand-made"), lower grades including "export" and several more.

Price is also affected by the use of costly woods, luxury decorations, and features such as a palm switch, grille mute, and so on. Some accordion makers sell a range of different models, from a less-expensive base model to a more costly luxury model. Typically, the register switches are described as Reeds: 5 + 3, meaning five reeds on the treble side and three on the bass, and Registers: 13 + M, 7, meaning 13 register buttons on the treble side plus a special "master" that activates all ranks, like the "tutti" or "full organ" switch on an organ, and seven register switches on the bass side. Another factor affecting the price is the presence of electronics, such as condenser microphones, volume and tone controls, or MIDI sensors and connections.

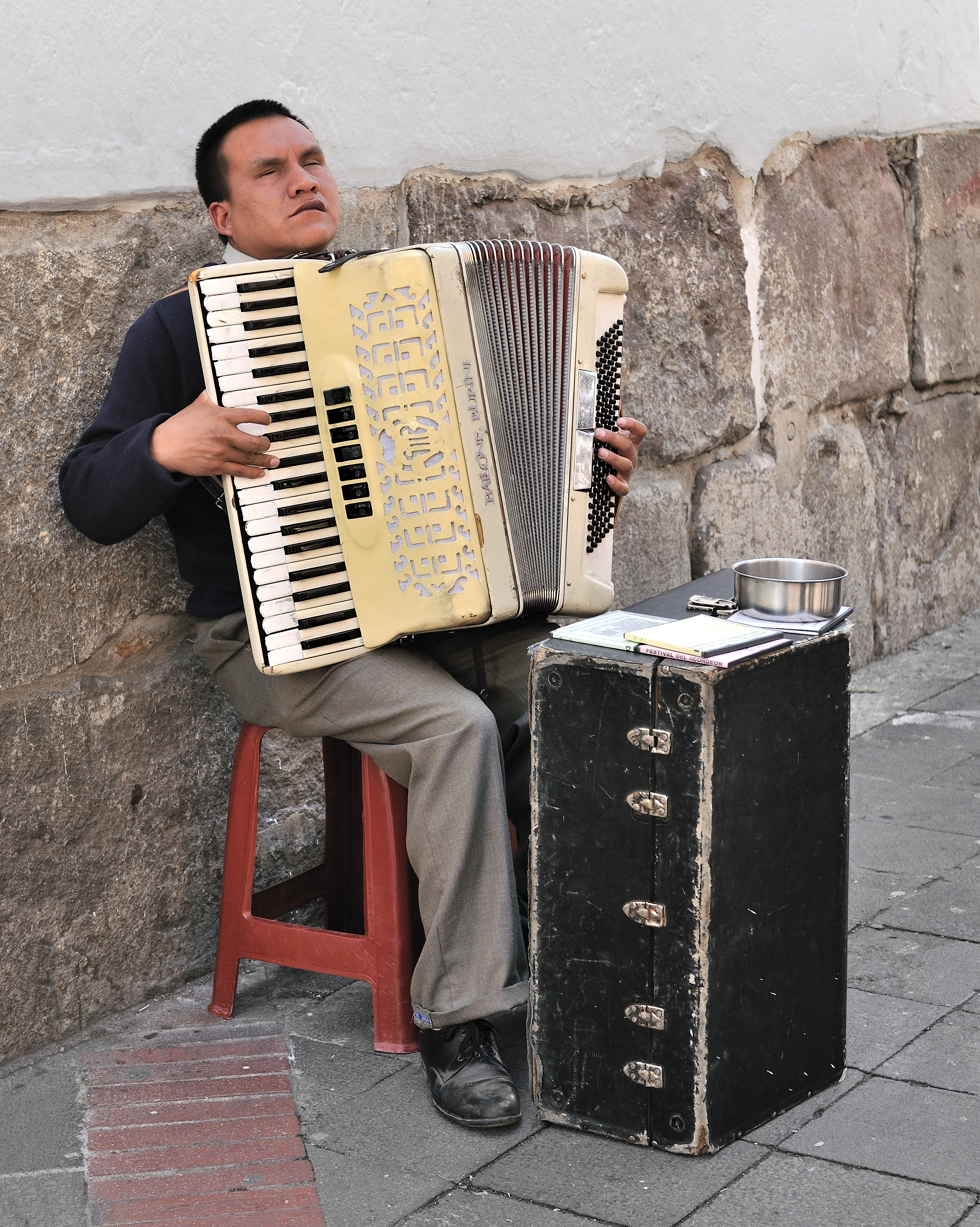
Accordion player on a street in the historic centre of Quito, Ecuador

==== Straps ====
The larger piano and chromatic button accordions are usually heavier than other smaller squeezeboxes, and are equipped with two shoulder straps to make it easier to balance the weight and increase bellows control while sitting, and avoid dropping the instrument while standing. Other accordions, such as the diatonic button accordion, have only a single shoulder strap and a right hand thumb strap. All accordions have a (mostly adjustable) leather strap on the left-hand side to keep the player's hand in position while drawing the bellows. There are also straps above and below the bellows to keep it securely closed when the instrument is not being played.

==== Electronic and digital ====
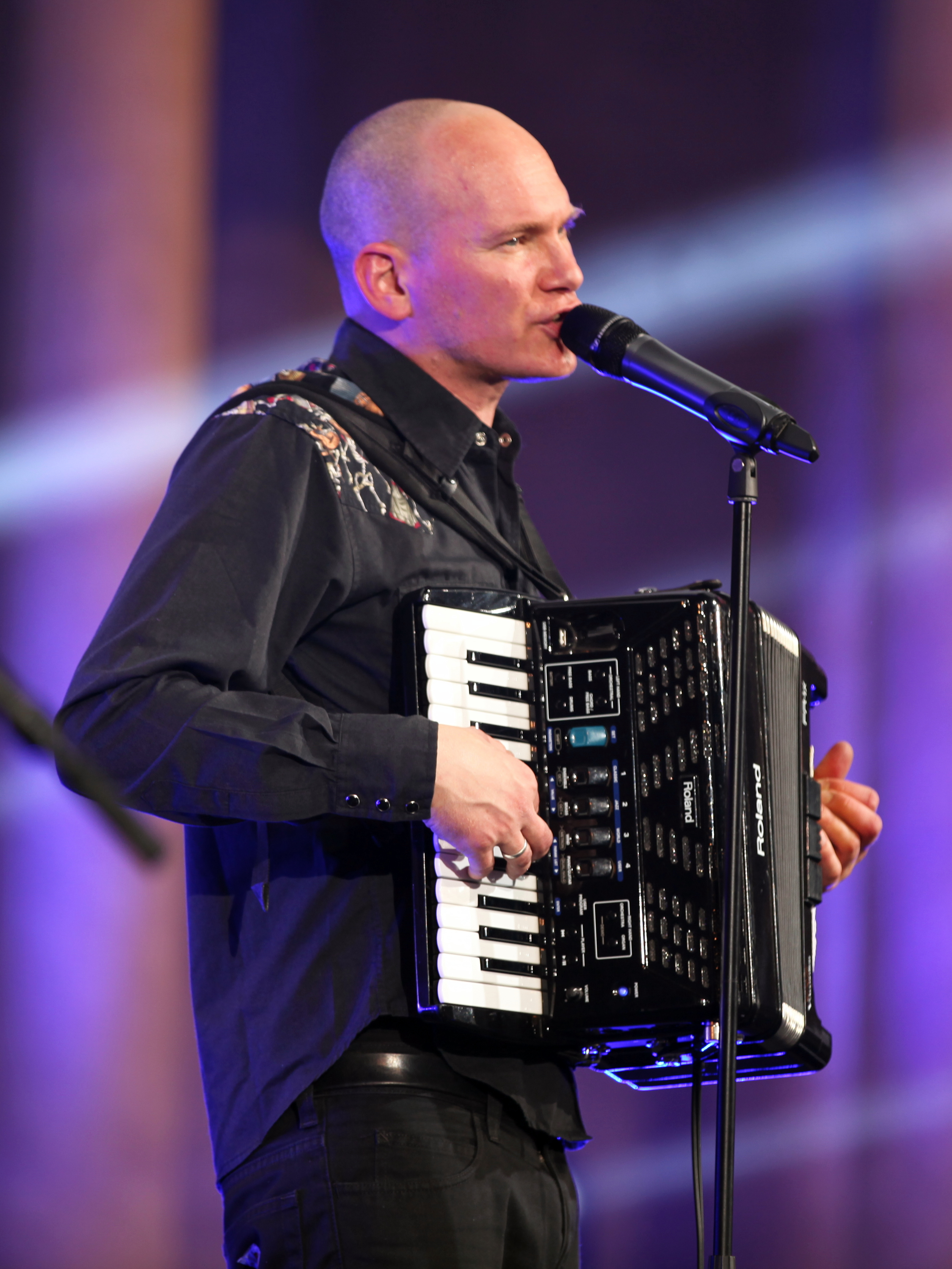
Rainer von Vielen playing a Roland digital V-Accordion. The bank of electronic switches can change the accordion's sound, tone and volume.

In the 2010s, a range of electronic and digital accordions were introduced. They have an electronic sound module which creates the accordion sound, and most use MIDI systems to encode the keypresses and transmit them to the sound module. A digital accordion can have hundreds of sounds, which can include different types of accordions and even non-accordion sounds, such as pipe organ, piano, or guitar. Sensors are used on the buttons and keys, such as magnetic reed switches. Sensors are also used on the bellows to transmit the pushing and pulling of the bellows to the sound module. Digital accordions may have features not found in acoustic instruments, such as a piano-style sustain pedal, a modulation control for changing keys, and a portamento effect.

As an electronic instrument, these types of accordions are plugged into a PA system or keyboard amplifier to produce sound. Some digital accordions have a small internal speaker and amplifier, so they can be used without a PA system or keyboard amplifier, at least for practicing and small venues like coffeehouses. One benefit of electronic accordions is that they can be practiced with headphones, making them inaudible to other people nearby. On a digital accordion, the volume of the right-hand keyboard and the left-hand buttons can be independently adjusted.

Acoustic-digital hybrid accordions also exist. They are acoustic accordions (with reeds, bellows, and so on), but they also contain sensors, electronics, and MIDI connections, which provides a wider range of sound options. An acoustic-digital hybrid may be manufactured in this form, or it may be an acoustic accordion which has had aftermarket electronics sensors and connections added. Several companies sell aftermarket electronics kits, but they are typically installed by professional accordion technicians, because of the complex and delicate nature of the internal parts of an accordion.

=== Unusual accordions ===
Various hybrid accordions have been created between instruments of different buttonboards and actions. Many remain curiosities – only a few have remained in use:

- The Schrammel accordion, used in Viennese chamber music and klezmer, which has the treble buttonboard of a chromatic button accordion and a bisonoric bass buttonboard, similar to an expanded diatonic button accordion
- The Steirische Harmonika, a type of bisonoric diatonic button accordion particular to the Alpine folk music of Slovenia, Austria, the Czech Republic, the German state of Bavaria, and the Italian South Tyrol
- The schwyzerörgeli or Swiss organ, which usually has a three-row diatonic treble and 18 unisonoric bass buttons in a bass/chord arrangement – a subset of the Stradella system in reverse order like the Belgian bass – that travel parallel to the bellows motion
- The trikitixa of the Basque people, which has a two-row diatonic, bisonoric treble and a 12-button diatonic unisonoric bass
- The British chromatic accordion, the favoured diatonic accordion in Scotland. While the right hand is bisonoric, the left hand follows the Stradella system. The elite form of this instrument is generally considered the German manufactured Shand Morino, produced by Hohner with the input of Sir Jimmy Shand
- Pedal harmony, a type of accordion used sometimes in Polish folk music, which has a pair of pump organ-like bellows attached.
- The Finnish composer and accordionist Veli Kujala developed a quarter tone accordion together with the Italian accordion manufacturer Pigini in 2005, and has written works for it. It deploys the same system as the concert accordion, with a scale of five octaves, each divided into 24 quarter tones. Other notable composers who have written concertos for the quarter tone accordion include Jukka Tiensuu and Sampo Haapamäki.

== Manufacturing process ==
The most expensive accordions are typically fully hand-made, particularly the reeds; completely hand-made reeds have a better tonal quality than even the best automatically manufactured ones. Some accordions have been modified by individuals striving to bring a more pure sound out of low-end instruments, such as the ones improved by Yutaka Usui, a Japanese craftsman.

The manufacture of an accordion is only a partly automated process. In a sense, all accordions are handmade, since there is always some hand assembly of the small parts required. The general process involves making the individual parts, assembling the subsections, assembling the entire instrument, and final decorating and packaging.

Notable centres of production are the Italian cities of Stradella and Castelfidardo, with many small and medium size manufacturers especially at the latter. Castelfidardo honours the memory of Paolo Soprani who was one of the first large-scale producers. Maugein Freres has built accordions in the French town of Tulle since 1919, and the company is now the last complete-process manufacturer of accordions in France. German companies such as Hohner and Weltmeister made large numbers of accordions, but production diminished by the end of the 20th century. Hohner still manufactures its top-end models in Germany, and Weltmeister instruments are still handmade by HARMONA Akkordeon GmbH in Klingenthal.

== Use in various music genres ==
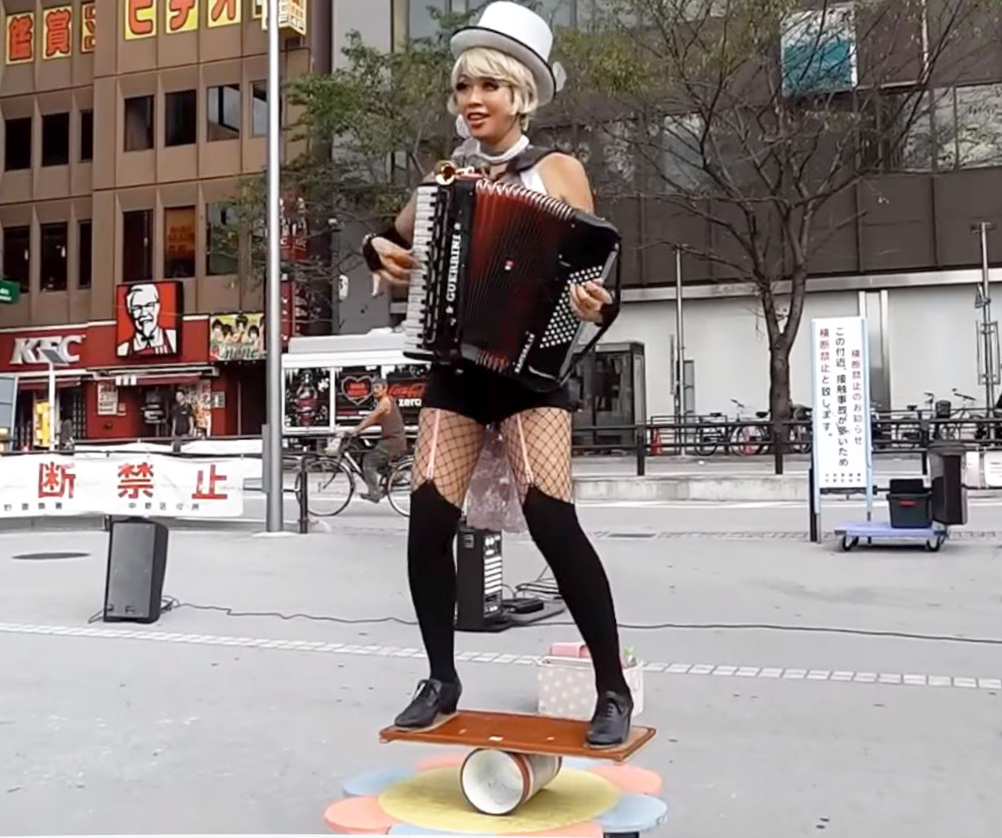
A street performer playing the accordion

The accordion has traditionally been used to perform folk or ethnic music, popular music, and transcriptions from the operatic and light-classical music repertoire. It was also used by the Kikuyu tribe in Kenya and is the main instrument in the traditional Mwomboko dance. Today the instrument is sometimes heard in contemporary pop styles, such as rock and pop-rock, and occasionally even in serious classical music concerts, as well as advertisements.

=== Use in traditional music ===
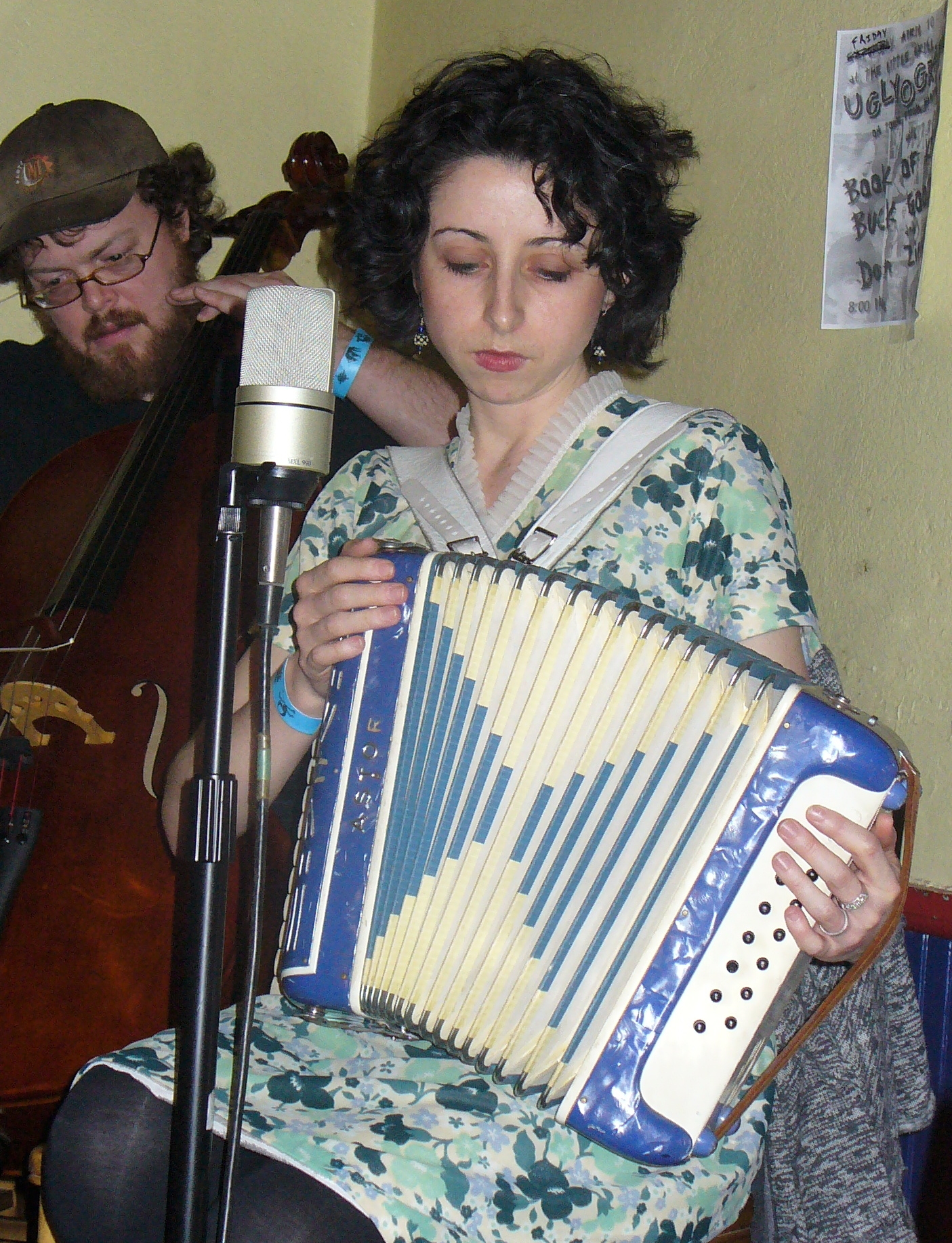
A folk accordionist, 2009

The accordion's popularity spread rapidly: it has mostly been associated with the common people, and was propagated by Europeans who emigrated around the world. The accordion in both button and piano forms became a favorite of folk musicians and has been integrated into traditional music styles all over the world: see the list of music styles that incorporate the accordion.

=== Use in jazz ===
==== Notable jazz accordionists ====
Early jazz accordionists include Charles Melrose, who recorded Wailing Blues/Barrel House Stomp (1930, Voc. 1503) with the Cellar Boys; Buster Moten, who played second piano and accordion in the Bennie Moten orchestra; and Jack Cornell, who did recordings with Irving Mills.

Jazz accordionists from the United States include Joe Mooney, Art Van Damme, Leon Sash, Pete Jolly, Ernie Felice, Lawrence Welk, Dick Contino, Milton DeLugg, Billy Costa, John Serry Sr., Frank Marocco, Orlando DiGirolamo, Dominic Frontiere, Angelo Di Pippo, Steve Bach, Guy Klucevsek, Yuri Lemeshev, Dr. William Schimmel, and Lee Tomboulian. French jazz accordionists include Richard Galliano, Bernard Lubat, and Vincent Peirani. Norwegian jazz accordionists include Asmund Bjørken, Stian Carstensen, Gabriel Fliflet, Frode Haltli, and Eivin One Pedersen.

==== Left hand techniques ====
The constraints of the Stradella bass system, limiting the left hand to preset chord buttons, is a barrier to some jazz chord conventions. Jazz accordionists expand the range of chord possibilities by using more than one chord button simultaneously, or by using combinations of a chord button and a bass note other than the typical root of the chord. An example of the former technique is used to play a minor seventh chord. To play an Am^{7(add9)} chord, the Am and Em preset buttons are pressed simultaneously, along with an A bassnote. An example of the latter technique is used to play the half-diminished chord. To play an E^{ø7}, a Gm preset button is pressed along with an E bassnote.

For the left hand, the free-bass system is used in jazz as a means of creating complex chord voicings. Jazz harmony that would otherwise be difficult to replicate with the Stradella bass system, such as tritone substitutions, become more accessible using a free-bass accordion.

=== Use in popular music ===
New York Blues
A 1916 recording of "New York Blues" composed and performed by Pietro Frosini, one of the first major stars of the accordion

The accordion appeared in popular music from the 1900s to the 1960s. This half-century is often called the "golden age of the accordion". Five players, Pietro Frosini, the two brothers Count Guido Deiro and Pietro Deiro and Slovenian brothers Vilko Ovsenik and Slavko Avsenik, Charles Magnante were major influences at this time.

Most vaudeville theaters closed during the Great Depression, but accordionists during the 1930s–1950s taught and performed for radio. Included among this group was the concert virtuoso John Serry, Sr. During the 1950s through the 1980s the accordion received significant exposure on television with performances by Myron Floren on The Lawrence Welk Show. In the late 1950s and early 1960s, the accordion declined in popularity because of the rise of rock and roll.

Angelo DiPippo can be seen playing his accordion in the motion picture The Godfather. He also composed and performed with his accordion on part of the soundtrack of Woody Allen's movie To Rome With Love. He was featured twice on The Tonight Show with Johnny Carson.

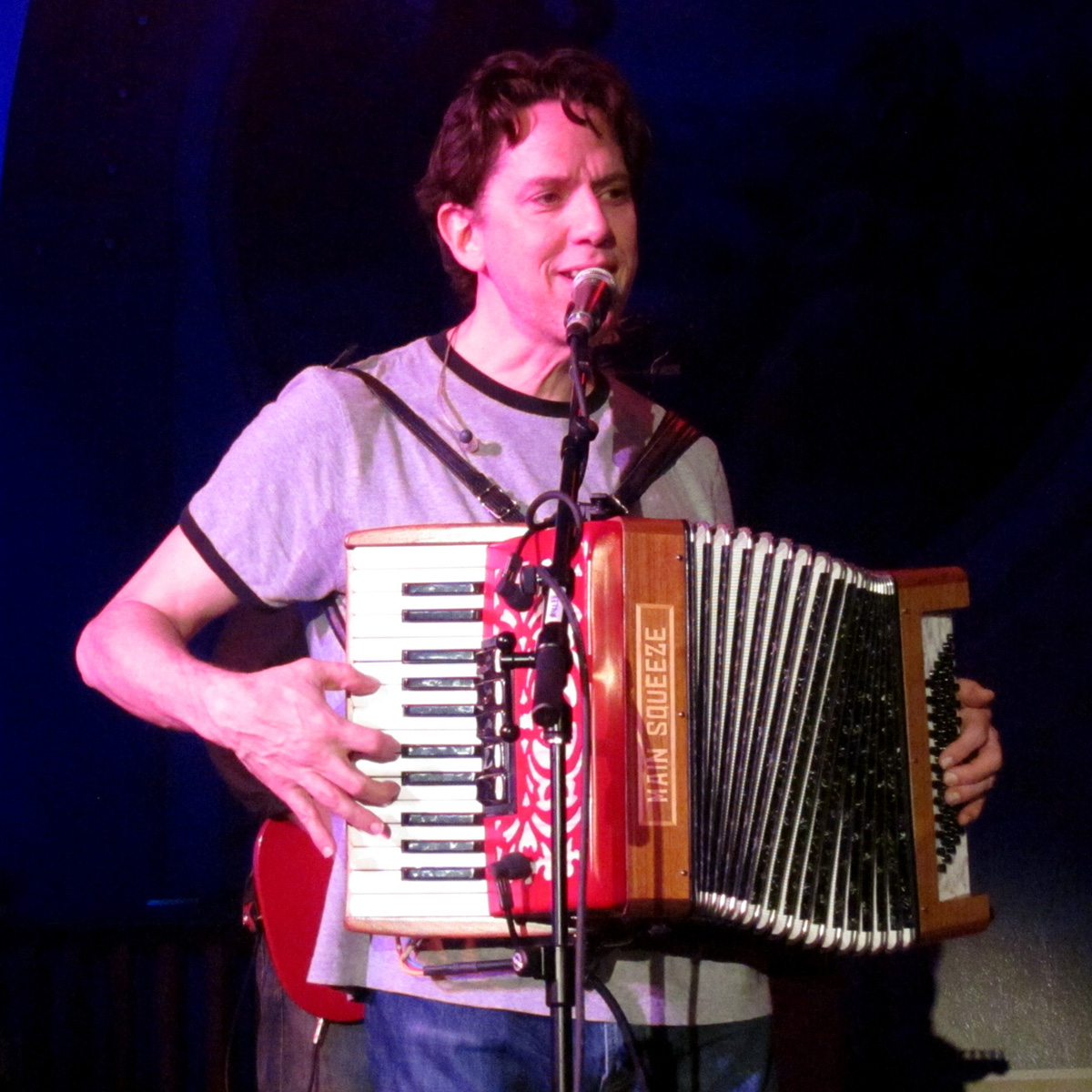
John Linnell of They Might Be Giants playing a Main Squeeze 911

Richard Galliano is an internationally known accordionist whose repertoire covers jazz, tango nuevo, Latin, and classical. Some popular bands use the instrument to create distinctive sounds.

Grammy Award-winning parodist "Weird Al" Yankovic plays the accordion on many of his musical tracks, particularly his polkas. Yankovic was trained in the accordion as a child.

=== Use in classical music ===
Although best known as a folk instrument, it has grown in popularity among classical composers. The earliest surviving concert piece is Thême varié très brillant pour accordéon methode Reisner, written in 1836 by Louise Reisner of Paris. Other composers, including the Russian Pyotr Ilyich Tchaikovsky, the Italian Umberto Giordano, and the American Charles Ives, wrote works for the diatonic button accordion.

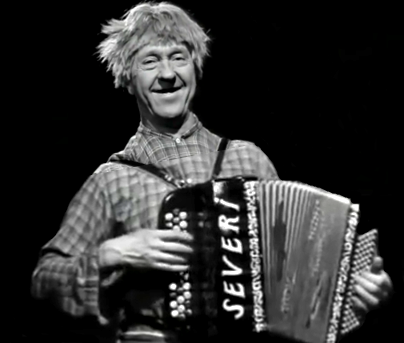
Finnish accordionist Esa Pakarinen (Feeliks Esaias Pakarinen, 1911–1989)

The first composer to write specifically for the chromatic accordion was Paul Hindemith. In 1922, the Austrian Alban Berg included an accordion in Wozzeck, Op. 7. In 1937, the first accordion concerto was composed in Russia. Other notable composers have written for the accordion during the first half of the 20th century. Included among this group was the Italian-American John Serry Sr., whose Concerto for Free Bass Accordion was completed in 1964. In addition, the American accordionist Robert Davine composed his Divertimento for Flute, Clarinet, Bassoon and Accordion as a work for chamber orchestra. The American Accordionists' Association awarded a commission to Nicolas Flagello in 1964 for his virtuosic Introduction and Scherzo for solo accordion. American composer William P. Perry featured the accordion in his orchestral suite Six Title Themes in Search of a Movie (2008). The experimental composer Howard Skempton began his musical career as an accordionist, and has written numerous solo works for it. In his work Drang (1999), British composer John Palmer pushed the expressive possibilities of the accordion/bayan. Luciano Berio wrote Sequenza XIII (1995) for accordionist Teodoro Anzellotti. Accordionists like Mogens Ellegaard, Joseph Macerollo, Nick Ariondo, Friedrich Lips, Hugo Noth, Dr. William Schimmel (also a composer), Stefan Hussong, Teodoro Anzellotti, and Geir Draugsvoll, encouraged composers to write new music for the accordion (solo and chamber music) and also started playing baroque music on the free bass accordion.

French composer Henri Dutilleux used an accordion in both his late song cycles Correspondences (2003) and Le Temps L'Horloge (2009). Russian-born composer Sofia Gubaidulina has composed solos, concertos, and chamber works for accordion. Astor Piazzolla's concert tangos are performed widely. Piazzolla performed on the bandoneon, but his works are also performed on or accordion. Dr. William schimmel and "The Tango Project" recorded a number of hit recordings and appeared in the movie Scent of a Woman with Al Pacino which earned Pacino an Oscar. Their recordings were used in many films.

=== Australia ===
The earliest mention of the novel accordion instrument in Australian music occurs in the 1830s. The accordion initially competed against cheaper and more convenient reed instruments such as mouth organ, concertina and melodeon. Frank Fracchia was an Australian accordion composer and copies of his works "My dear, can you come out tonight" and "Dancing with you" are preserved in Australian libraries. Other Australian composers who arranged music for accordion include Reginald Stoneham. The popularity of the accordion peaked in the late 1930s and continued until the 1950s. The accordion was particularly favoured by buskers. The Accordion Society of Australia (ASA) holds state based and national accordion competitions throughout Australia.

=== Bosnia and Herzegovina ===
The accordion is a traditional instrument in Bosnia and Herzegovina. It is the dominant instrument used in sevdalinka, a traditional genre of folk music from Bosnia and Herzegovina.

=== Brazil ===
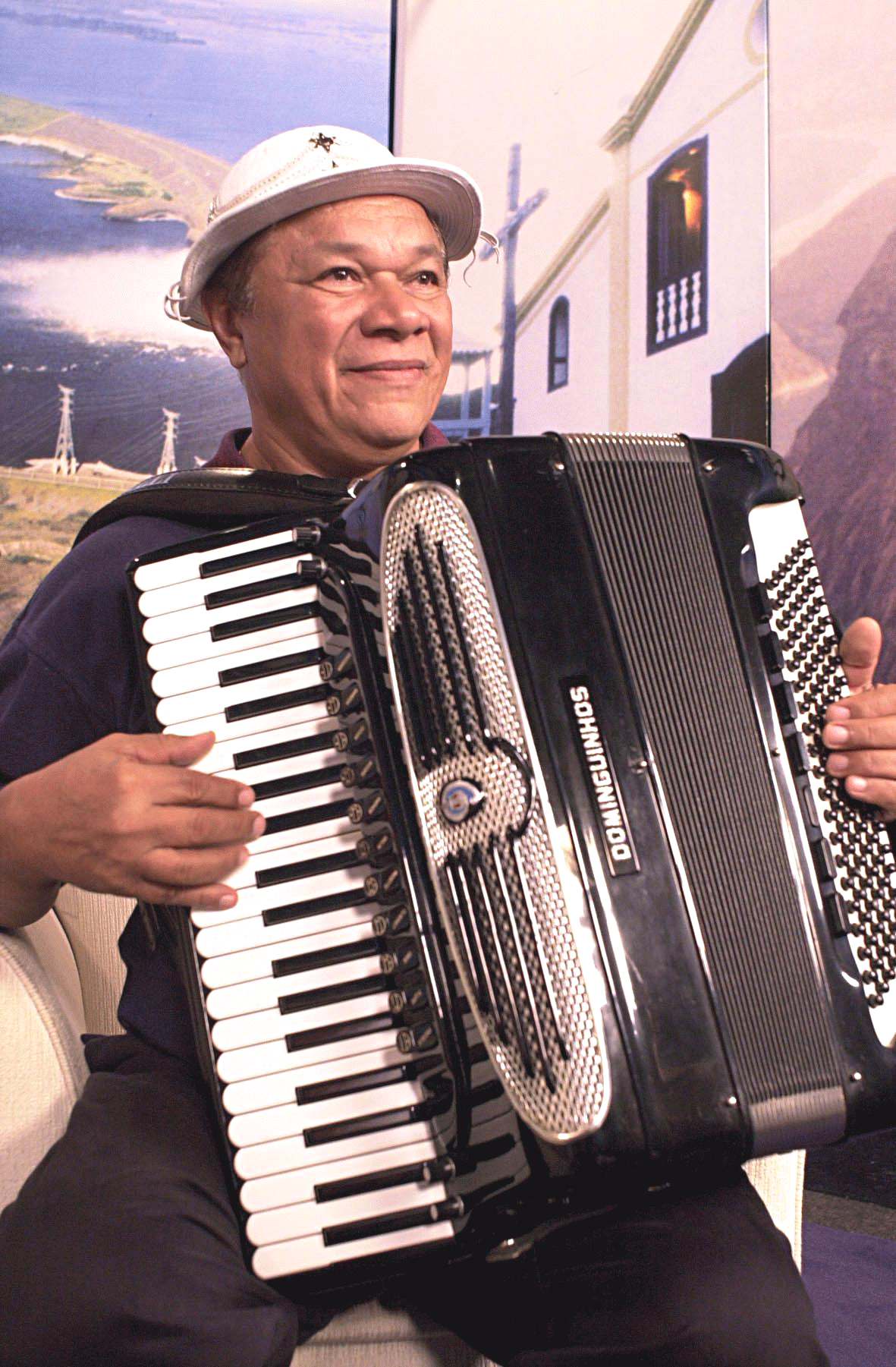
Brazilian accordionist Dominguinhos (José Domingos de Morais, 1941–2013)

The accordion was brought to Brazil by settlers and immigrants from Europe, especially from Italy and Germany, who mainly settled in the south (Rio Grande do Sul, Santa Catarina and Paraná). The first instrument brought was a "Concertina" (a 120 button chromatic accordion). The instrument was popular in the 1950s, and it was common to find several accordions in the same house. There are many different configurations and tunes which were adapted from the cultures that came from Europe.

Accordion is the official symbol instrument of the Rio Grande do Sul state, where it was voted by unanimity in the deputy chamber. During the boom of accordions there were around 65 factories in Brazil, where most of them (52) in the south, in Rio Grande do Sul state, with only 7 outside the south. One of the most famous and genuinely Brazilian brands was Accordeões Todeschini from Bento Gonçalves-RS, closed in 1973. The Todeschini accordion is very appreciated today and survives with very few maintainers. The most notable musicians of button accordions are Renato Borghetti, Adelar Bertussi, Albino Manique and Edson Dutra.

Compared to many other countries, the instrument is very popular in mainstream pop music. In some parts of the country, such as the northeast it is the most popular melodic instrument. As opposed to most European folk accordions, a very dry tuning is usually used in Brazil. Outside the south, the accordion (predominantly the piano accordion) is used in almost all styles of Forró (in particular in the subgenres of Xote and Baião) as the principal instrument, Luiz Gonzaga (the "King of the Baião") and Dominguinhos being among the notable musicians in this style from the northeast. In this musical style the typical combination is a trio of accordion, triangle and zabumba (a type of drum).

This style has gained popularity recently, in particular among the student population of the southeast of the country (in the Forró Universitário genre, with important exponents today being Falamansa, and trios such as Trio Dona Zefa, Trio Virgulino and Trio Alvorada). Moreover, the accordion is the principal instrument in Junina music (music of the São João Festival), with Mario Zan having been a very important exponent of this music. It is an important instrument in Sertanejo (and Caipira) music, which originated in the midwest and southeast of Brazil, and subsequently has gained popularity throughout the country.

=== China ===
The number of accordionists in China exceeds every other country in the world, and possibly every country combined. Introduced in 1926, the accordion has risen to popularity in China throughout the years, thanks to Russian teachers and its being a popular instrument in the People's Liberation Army, and remains popular.

In the late 20th century, the development of high performance standards for the accordion within China's halls of academe was also influenced by several American virtuosos including Robert Davine, who was invited by the Ministry of Culture of the People's Republic to present Master Classes and to broaden its national program of music for the accordion in 1984.

=== Colombia ===
The accordion is also a traditional instrument in Colombia, commonly associated with the vallenato and cumbia genres. The accordion has been used by tropipop musicians such as Carlos Vives, Andrés Cabas, Fonseca (singer) and Bacilos, as well as rock musicians such as Juanes and pop musicians as Shakira. Vallenato, who emerged in the early twentieth century in Valledupar, and have come to symbolize the folk music of Colombia.

Every year in April, Colombia holds one of the most important musical festivals in the country: the Vallenato Legend Festival. The festival holds contests for best accordion player. Once every decade, the "King of Kings" accordion competition takes place, where winners of the previous festivals compete for the highest possible award for a vallenato accordion player: the Pilonera Mayor prize. This is the world's largest competitive accordion festival.

=== Czech Republic ===
At U Flekú, Prague

Accordion is often played at traditional Czech pubs, such as U Flekú, Prague.

=== Japan ===
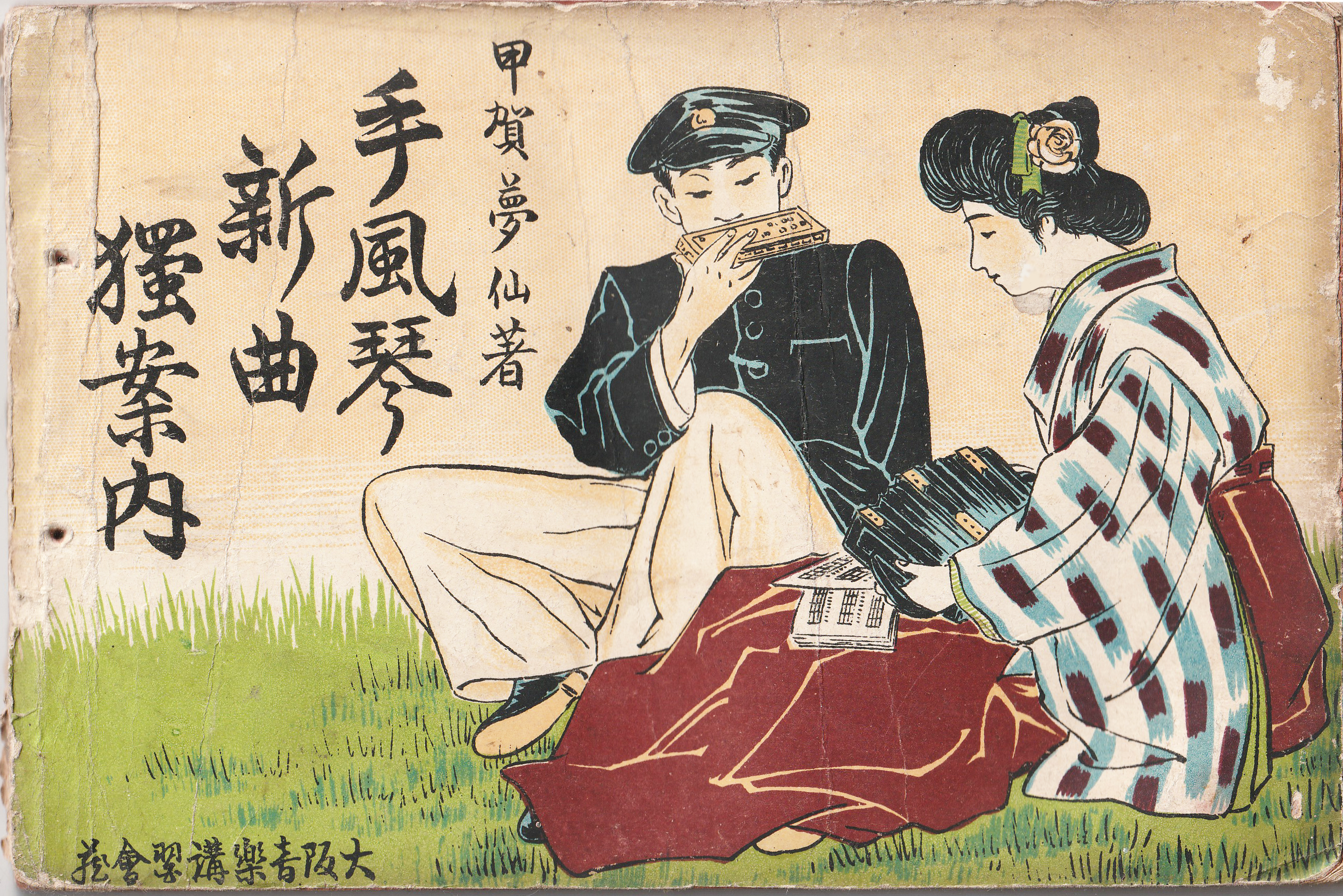
A school boy playing harmonica, and a school girl playing one-row diatonic accordion. A self-study book published in 1899 in Japan.

In 18XX, the accordion was brought to Japan.

=== Malaysia ===
The accordion is an important instrument to ronggeng performed among the Malay and Peranakan; it is also often interchangeable with the harmonium in playing the ghazal; Suhaimi Mohd Zain was one notable accordionist who frequently collaborated with folk pop singer Siti Nurhaliza.

=== Mexico ===
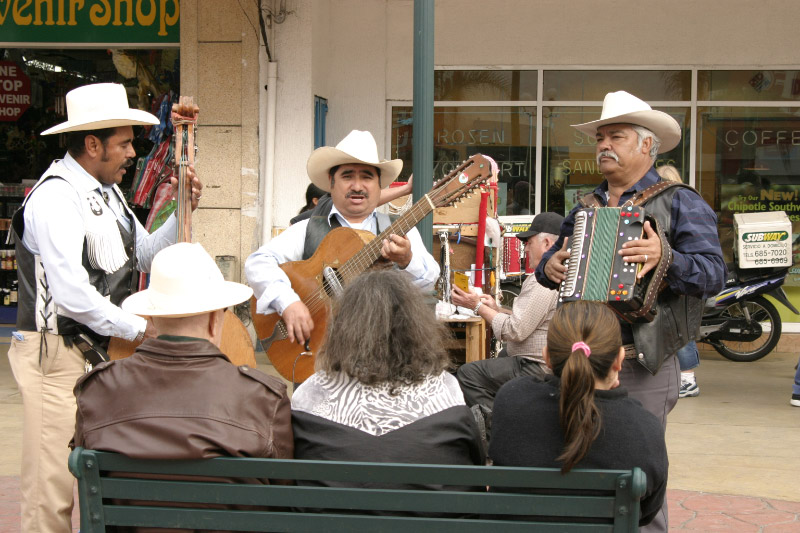
A Norteño band, including an accordion

Norteño heavily relies on the accordion; it is a genre related to polka. Ramón Ayala, known in Mexico as the "King of the Accordion", is a norteño musician. Cumbia, which features the accordion, is also popular with musicians such as Celso Piña, creating a more contemporary style. U.S.-born Mexican musician Julieta Venegas incorporates the sound of the instrument into rock, pop and folk. She was influenced by her fellow Chicanos Los Lobos who also use the music of the accordion.

=== North Korea ===
According to Barbara Demick in Nothing to Envy, the accordion is known as "the people's instrument" and all North Korean teachers were expected to learn the accordion.

=== United States ===
Accordions are played in Tejano music, Cajun and Creole music, zydeco, klezmer, and polka.

During the post-World War II era from the 1940s to the 1960s, accordions were widely used in the United States for performances of traditional Western classical music within the configuration of large free-reed symphonic orchestras both in live performances on the concert hall stage and in phonograph recordings. Included among the leading accordion orchestras were: The New York Accordion Symphony in New York City, The Springfield Accordion Orchestra in Massachusetts, The Houston Accordion Symphony in Houston, Texas and The Philadelphia Accordion Orchestra in Philadelphia, Pennsylvania. Prominent orchestra members included: Joe Biviano (President of the American Accordionists Association) Carmen Carrozza, Orlando Di Girolamo (President of the American Symphony Society), Tony Mecca (who collaborated with Leonard Bernstein), Angelo Di Pippo (jazz accordionist and arranger for Robert Merrill), John Serry Sr. and Alfonso Veltri (Director of the National Conservatory of Music). By the 1960s recordings such Pietro Deiro Presents the Accordion Orchestra also emerged on leading record labels in the United States and were even praised for their high level of musicality in The Billboard magazine.

== Other audio samples ==
Accordion chords
Chords being played on an accordion – 145 KB

Accordion tones
Audio clip of the same octave cycled through five different timbres (Piano Accordion) – 676 KB

== See also ==
- List of accordionists
- Steirische Harmonika
- Confédération internationale des accordéonistes
