= Squeezebox =

Aerophone instrument

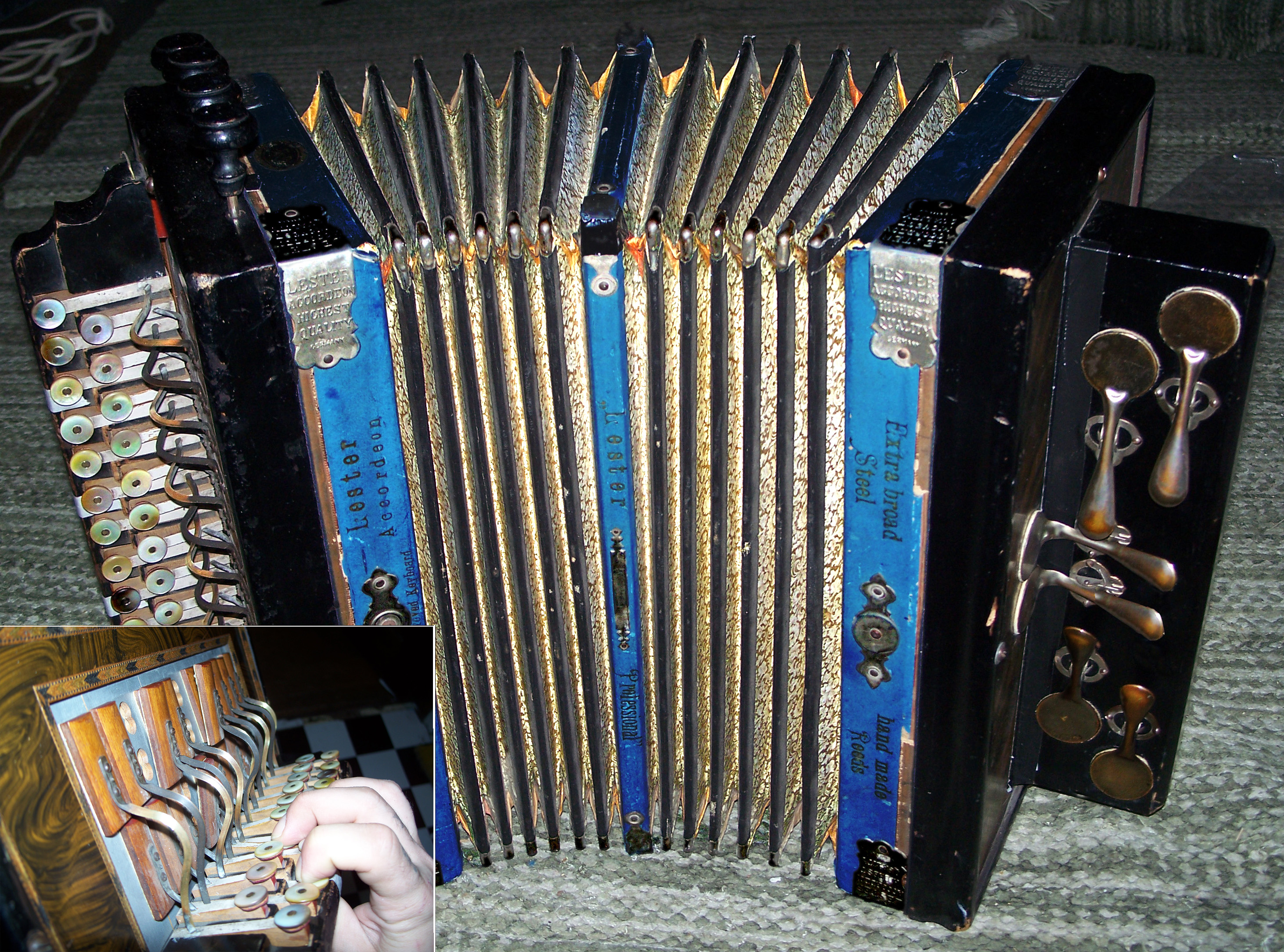
Diatonic button accordion (German make, early 20th century)

The term squeezebox (also squeeze box, squeeze-box) is a colloquial expression referring to any musical instrument of the general class of hand-held bellows-driven free reed aerophones such as the accordion and the concertina. The term is so applied because such instruments are generally in the shape of a rectangular prism or box, and the bellows is operated by squeezing in and drawing out.

Accordions (including piano accordions and button accordions) typically have right-hand buttons or keys that play single notes (melody) and left hand buttons that play chords and bass notes.

The bandoneon is a type of concertina particularly popular in South America and Lithuania, frequently featuring in tango ensembles.

Concertinas (including the English concertina, Anglo concertina and bandoneon) play single notes (melody) on both left and right hands.

The Indian harmonium remains an important instrument in many genres of Indian music, stemming from French-made hand-pumped harmoniums being brought to India by missionaries in the mid-19th century.

The flutina is an early precursor to the diatonic button accordion.
