= Accordion reed ranks and switches =

Components of an accordion

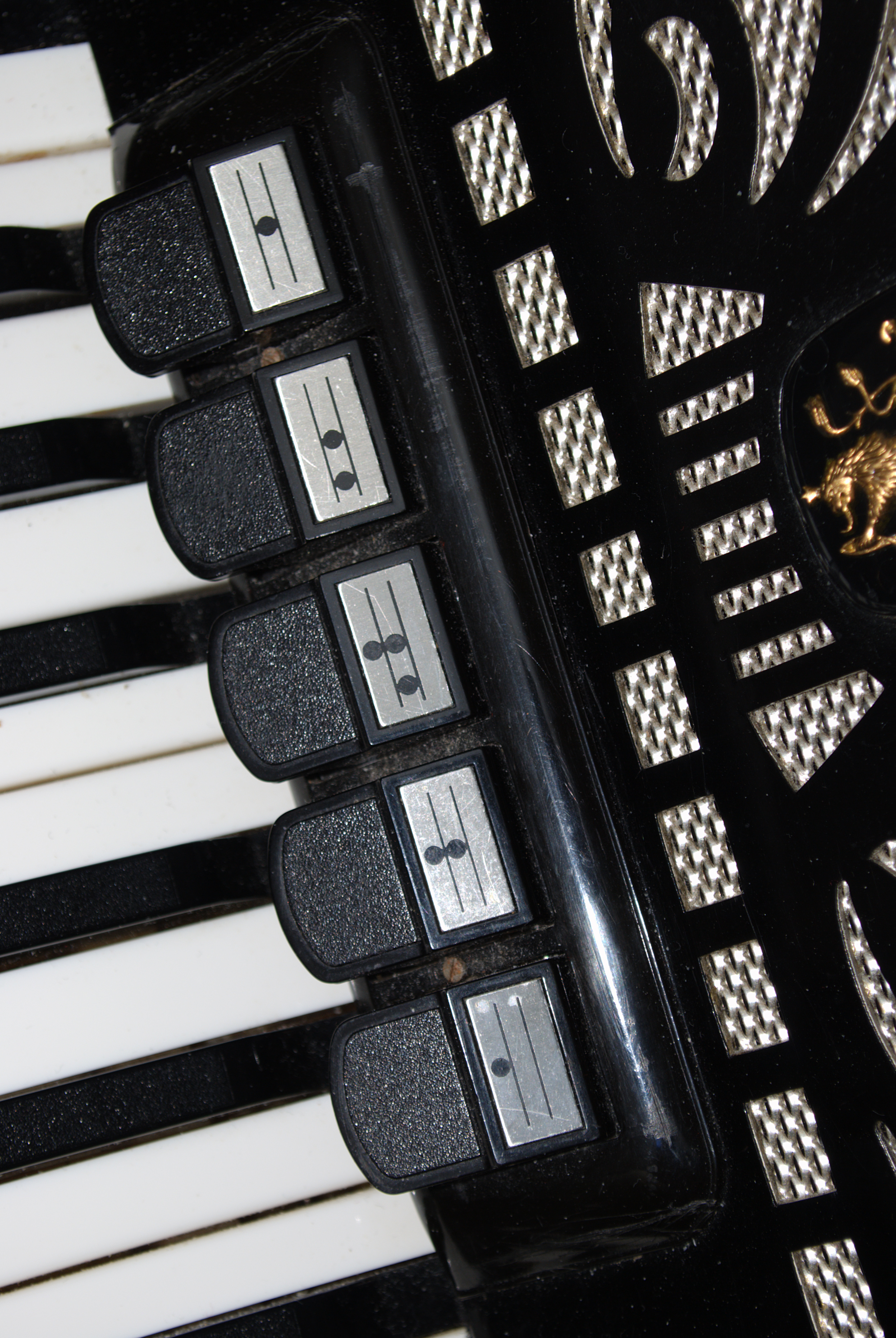
Right-hand manual register switches. This accordion has three different voices.

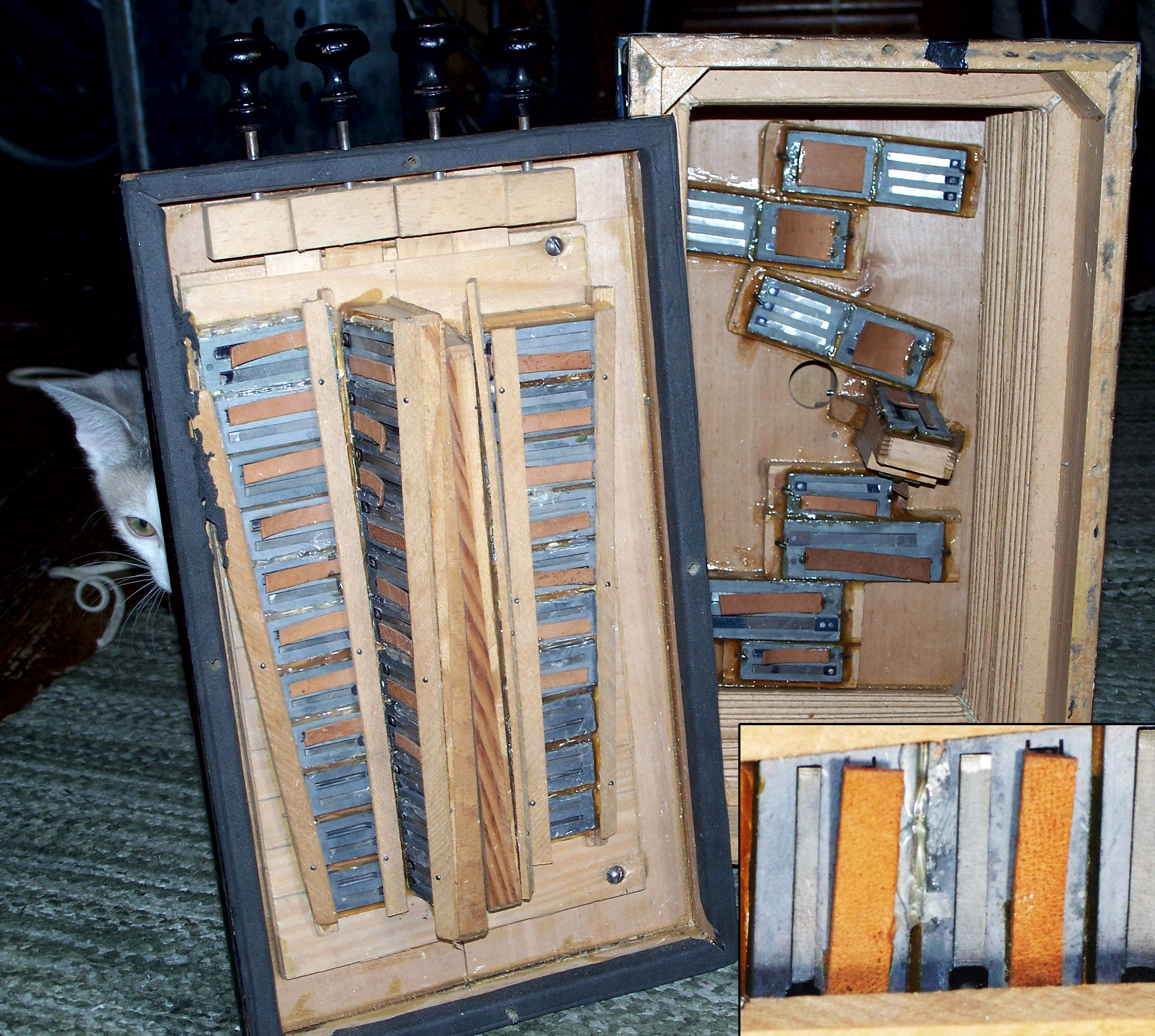
Accordion reed ranks with closeup of reeds

A reed rank inside an accordion is a single full set of the reeds that are the means to achieve the instrument's sound range. These reed ranks are located in the reed chamber. Most accordions to this date typically have between two and four reed ranks on the treble side and between three and five reed ranks on the bass side. These can usually be selected individually or combined in various ways to provide a range of different timbres, by use of register switches arranged by register from high to low. More of the top-line expensive accordions may contain five or six reed blocks on the treble side for different tunings, typically found in accordions that stress musette sounds.

How many reeds an accordion has is specified by the number of treble ranks and bass ranks. For example, a 4/5 accordion has four reeds on the treble side and five on the bass side. A 3/4 accordion has three reeds on the treble sides and four on the bass side.

Reed ranks are classified by either organ 'foot-length' stops or instrument names. Visually, they each have a fixed dot in a three-level icon as displayed in the photo on the right and tables below. These icons display when more than one reed-rank is in use.

== Register stop classifications ==
The pitch of a single bank of reeds is traditionally defined in a similar manner to the organ stops of a pipe organ. A bank that sounds at unison pitch when keys are depressed is called 8′ (pronounced "eight-foot") pitch: alluding to the length of the lowest-sounding organ pipe in that rank, which is approximately eight feet. For the same reason, a stop that sounds an octave higher is at 4′ pitch, and one that sounds an octave lower than unison pitch is at 16′ pitch.

Most reed registers are normally in relative octave tuning, but rarely, some instruments have a reed bank tuned to a perfect fifth relative to the 8′ stop (or some octave of that) such as the Bayan (accordion) in the new models. This is a similar arrangement to stops for a pipe organ.

On accordions with two 8′ ranks, one is tuned a fraction of a semitone (usually no more than 25 cents) higher than the other ranks. This causes beats when the two 8′ ranks sound together, creating a distinctive tremolo timbre. Tunings where the difference between the two is small and the beats are less noticeable are referred to as "dry", whereas those where the difference is large are referred to as "wet". Accordions with three 8′ ranks have the third tuned the same distance below the center, doubling the effect of the beats when all three play.

Reed ranks
Icon	Classification	Description
	4′ stop	This is the highest reed rank. Not all accordions will have this reed rank. It is an octave above the 8′ reference stop, and mostly serves to add color to the heavier reeds. In Italian, it is called the piccolo.
	8′ stop	This is the basic middle reed rank. It is the reference which is first tuned, then serves as a base for tuning the others. In Italian, it is called the clarino.
	Higher 8′ stop	This is another middle reed rank, the upper tremolo rank. It is usually tuned slightly higher than the basic middle reed rank. Not all accordions may have this reed rank.
	Lower 8′ stop	This is another middle reed rank, the lower tremolo rank. It is usually tuned slightly lower than the basic middle reed rank. Usually only included on special "musette accordions".
	16′ stop	This is the lowest and deepest-sounding reed rank in the reed chamber. It is one octave lower than an 8' reed rank.

== Register switches ==
Register switches select combinations of reed ranks to produce contrasting timbres. Most accordions have automatic or preset switches, similar to voice selection on an electronic keyboard, or (more precisely) to a preset combination action in a pipe organ. These switches control which reed ranks are enabled (opened up) or disabled (closed off): some switches enable a single reed rank, others enable several simultaneous reed ranks. In general, the formula for the number of potential switch combinations is one less than 2 to the number of unique reed blocks that are within the accordion. For example, if an accordion has 3 reed blocks, there are potentially 2^{3}-1 = 7 combinations, though "less useful" ones are often omitted. (Note: Strictly speaking, there are 2^{n} combinations (8 from 3 reed blocks), but the one with all ranks closed is only useful in organ accordions or MIDI accordions where it may be desired to play the electronic voices only. This can be seen on a "Closed" switch with no dots.) Unlike individual organ stops, only one combination is active at any given time.

Here are a few examples of right-hand manual switches on a typical large accordion. (Smaller instruments with fewer reed banks may have fewer switches or even none.)

Common register switches
Icon	Alternate icon (Note: These versions are seen on some accordions and sheet music. (Strictly speaking, they are inconsistent when one of the two middle reed ranks in question is the basic, natural-tuned, "clarino" middle reed rank, represented by a centered dot on other switches.))	Nickname	Register stop(s) in use	Sound
		Piccolo	4′	High, thin, reedy tone.
		Clarinet	8′	A round tone, relatively light in upper harmonics.
		Bassoon	16′	A low, full, smooth tone.
		Oboe	4′ + 8′	A bright tone.
		Violin	8′ + 8′	A shimmering or wavering "tremolo" or "chorus effect" from detuned reeds, analogous to the Voix céleste organ stop.
		Musette (imitation)	4′ + 8′ + 8′	Actually an imitation musette sound. Found in many accordions. (Compare to the authentic three-reed musette below.)
		Musette (authentic)	8′ + 8′ + 8′	A strong and distinctive tremolo sound, found in special musette accordions.
		Organ	4′ + 16′	A full yet hollow, slightly reedy quality.
		Harmonium	4′ + 8′ + 16′	Like the oboe combination, but heavier because of the added 16′ reed rank.
		Bandoneon	8′ + 16′	Characteristic round, mellow accordion sound.
		Accordion	8′ + 8′ + 16′	Like the violin combination, but heavier because of the added 16' reed rank.
		Master	4′ + 8′ + 8′ + 16′	The loudest and fullest accordion sound. On accordions of any size, the "master" combination uses all available reed ranks, and as a rule its symbol shows only the ranks actually present.

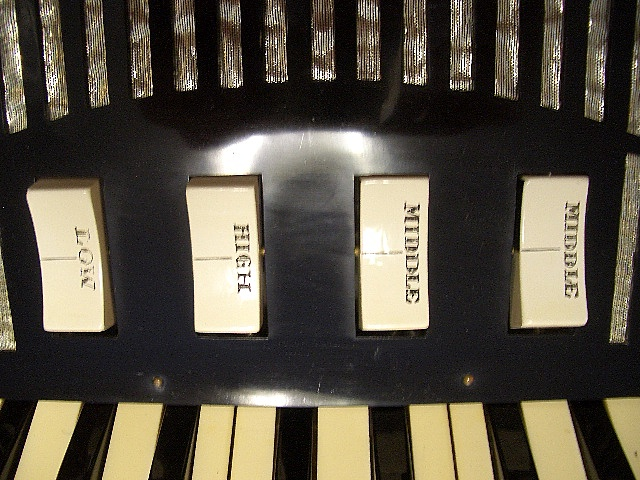
Two-way rocker switches controlling individual reed ranks

Instead of automatic switches, some accordions have individual switches for the reed ranks that can be used in any combination, like organ stops.

In addition to the master switch located with the other switches shown above, professional-grade accordions often have at least one extra master switch: either a chin master at the top of the instrument or palm master switch located at the side of the keyboard. These allow for faster changes to the register while the right hand is playing the melody. Some have double bassoon (16′ + 16′), equivalent to a tenor violin, and the tenor musette (16′ + 16′ + 8′) is also found in some model accordions.

== Cassotto ==
High-end accordions often have a feature called a cassotto (Italian for "box"), also referred to as a "tone chamber", in the treble (right-hand) reed section. In this design, certain reed sets (usually one set of middle reeds, and the set of low reeds) are mounted at a 90° angle to the remaining reeds. The sound from these specially-mounted reeds must then travel farther, and along a different path, before leaving the instrument, muting its harmonics (partials) and creating a distinctively mellow, refined sound. The sound of cassotto bassoon (low) reeds is particularly favored by jazz accordionists.

The cassotto design requires a sophisticated treble mechanism where each key must open and close air passages not only for reeds mounted at the traditional angle, but also for air passages at a relative 90° angle (for the cassotto reeds). To do this properly, each rod and pad must be positioned precisely in relation to its perpendicular counterpart. Because of the considerable extra time required for the cassotto's construction and adjustment, cassotto accordions cost considerably more than similar non-cassotto models.
