= VEB Klingenthaler Harmonikawerke =

Former state-owned company based in Klingenthal, Saxony

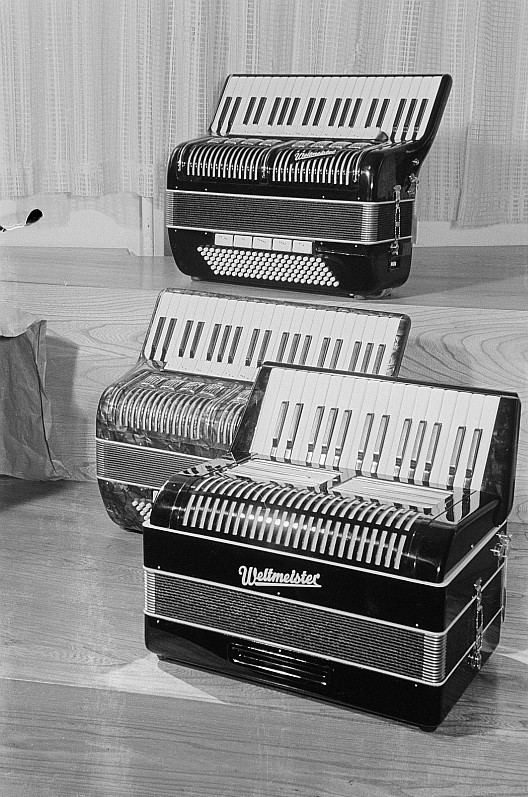
Three Weltmeister accordions

VEB Klingenthaler Harmonikawerke (KHW) was a state-owned company based in Klingenthal, Saxony, and was the main producer of accordions, harmonicas, and electronic instruments in East Germany.

== History ==
VEB Klingenthaler Harmonikawerke was established on 1 January 1949 through the consolidation of several private enterprises (F. A. Rauner, for example). 125,578 accordions were produced there in 1961 alone, which were exported to more than 40 countries. In 1964 VEB Vermona was incorporated into Klingenthaler Harmonikawerke. In 1972 a further 17 companies with state holdings were converted into state-owned companies and incorporated into VEB Klingenthaler Harmonikawerke (for example F. A. Böhm). The production and development of electronic instruments and effects pedals occurred in the factory at Schöneck, where the VERMONA logo first appeared on the ET-6 organ in 1972. In 1985 more than 3,000 people worked in the various sections.

In 1990, during German reunification, Klingenthaler Harmonikawerke was broken up into many independent enterprises, for example HDB electronic GmbH, which continues to produce the brand Vermona, and HARMONA Akkordeon GmbH, which makes Weltmeister accordions.

== Brands and products (selection) ==
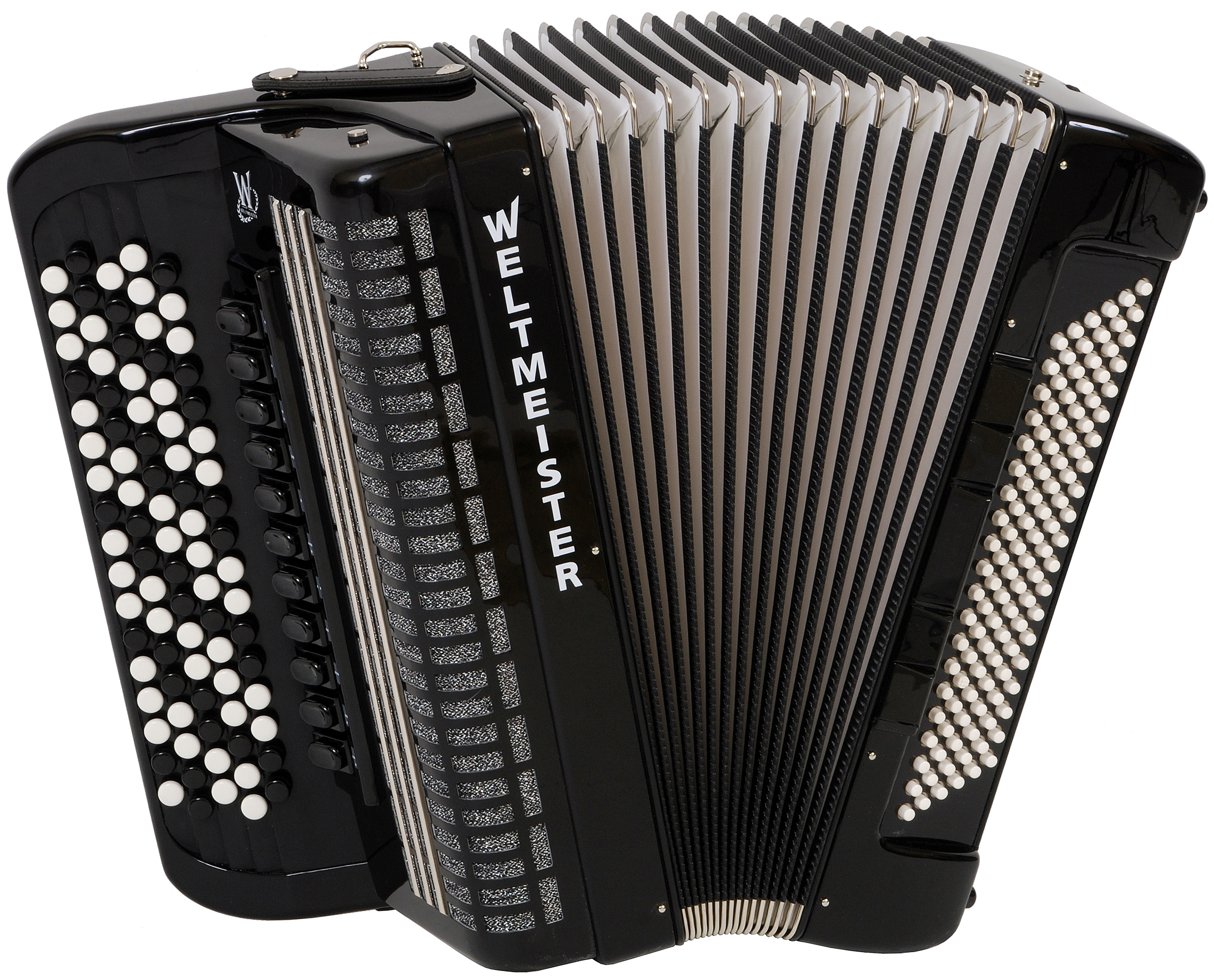
A Weltmeister Special 87 120 IV 11 5 Piccolo button accordion

- Goldon (toy piano)
- Weltmeister (accordions, electronic organs and electric pianos)
- Regent (amplifiers and speakers)
- Vermona (electronic organs, pianos and synthesizers)
- Bandmaster (triolas, harmonicas and melodicas)

== Artists ==
- Barbara Morgenstern plays a Vermona ET 6-1
