= Pietro Frosini =

American songwriter (1885–1951)

Pietro Frosìni
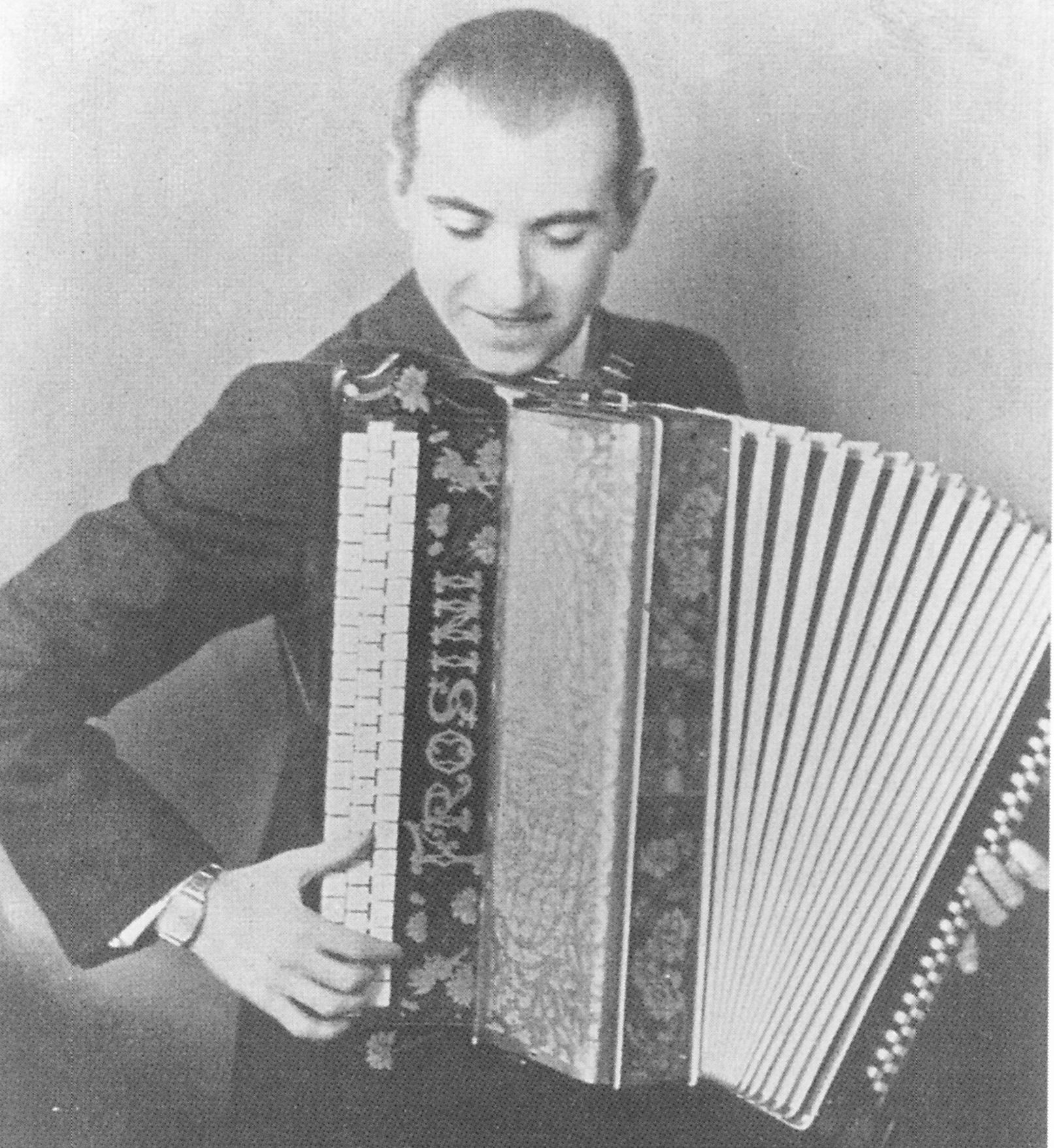

Background information
- Also known as: Frostini, S. Frigoli, G. Arditti (recording as)
- Born: Pietro Giuffrida; 9 August 1885; Catania, Sicily, Italy
- Died: 2 September 1951 (aged 66)
- Genres: polka
- Occupations: Vaudevillian; musician; composer/arranger; tutor
- Instrument: chromatic button accordion
- Labels: Victor, Decca

Pietro Frosini (9 August 1885 – 2 September 1951) professionally known mononymously as Frosini, was an Italian vaudeville performer, musician, and composer. Based in the United States, he was one of the first famous "stars of the accordion."

== Biography ==
=== Early life ===
He was born Pietro Giuffrida, in Mascalucia Province, Catania, Sicily, to a farming family in 1885 and began to play the chromatic button accordion at the age of six. By the age of 8, he was playing operatic and overtures on his father's accordion. In 1889, he joined the Municipal Conservatory of Fine Arts, originally taking up the cornet, and became a pupil of Francesco Paolo Frontina (whom he took his professional stage name from, as a tribute) studying composition and harmony. In 1902 he transferred to the Milan Conservatory of Music. He briefly served as a cornettist with a British Army Band in Malta, but after health complications after contracting malaria, he went back to his first love of the accordion.

=== Professional career ===
In 1905, Frosini emigrated to San Francisco and whilst performing Poet and Peasants Overture, by Suppe, was discovered by a talent agent of the Orpheum Vaudeville Circuit. Frosini made one of the first accordion recordings on a cylinder record for Edison in 1909 with Wedding on the Winds and made his first Victor recording in 1908. He traveled extensively on the vaudeville circuit in America and abroad and on a tour of England playing in music halls and provinces even performed for the King George V and releasing several records under his own name and the pseudonyms S. Frigoli and G. Arditti.

On the vaudeville circuit, Frosini met and became friends with fellow vaudevillian and accordionist Guido Deiro. After seeing the great success Deiro had with his audiences, Frosini adopted some of Deiro's methods: he began playing popular music along with classical and operatic selections, and he pasted a dummy piano accordion keyboard over his buttons, as audiences wanted to hear the more novel and unfamiliar piano accordion.

Frosini gave up vaudeville in 1932 when the "talkies" closed most vaudeville companies; he then became a staff accordionist for WOR radio in New York, a position he held until his death in 1951. Throughout his career, he performed, taught, composed and arranged music for the accordion. He wrote more than 200 original compositions for the instrument.

A "Frosini Society" based in Sweden was established in 1984 by Swedish accordionist Lars Ek.

In 1942, he became a member of ASCAP and was awarded for "Outstanding Service" in 1949 by the American Accordionists' Association
