= Renato Borghetti =

Brazilian folk musician and composer

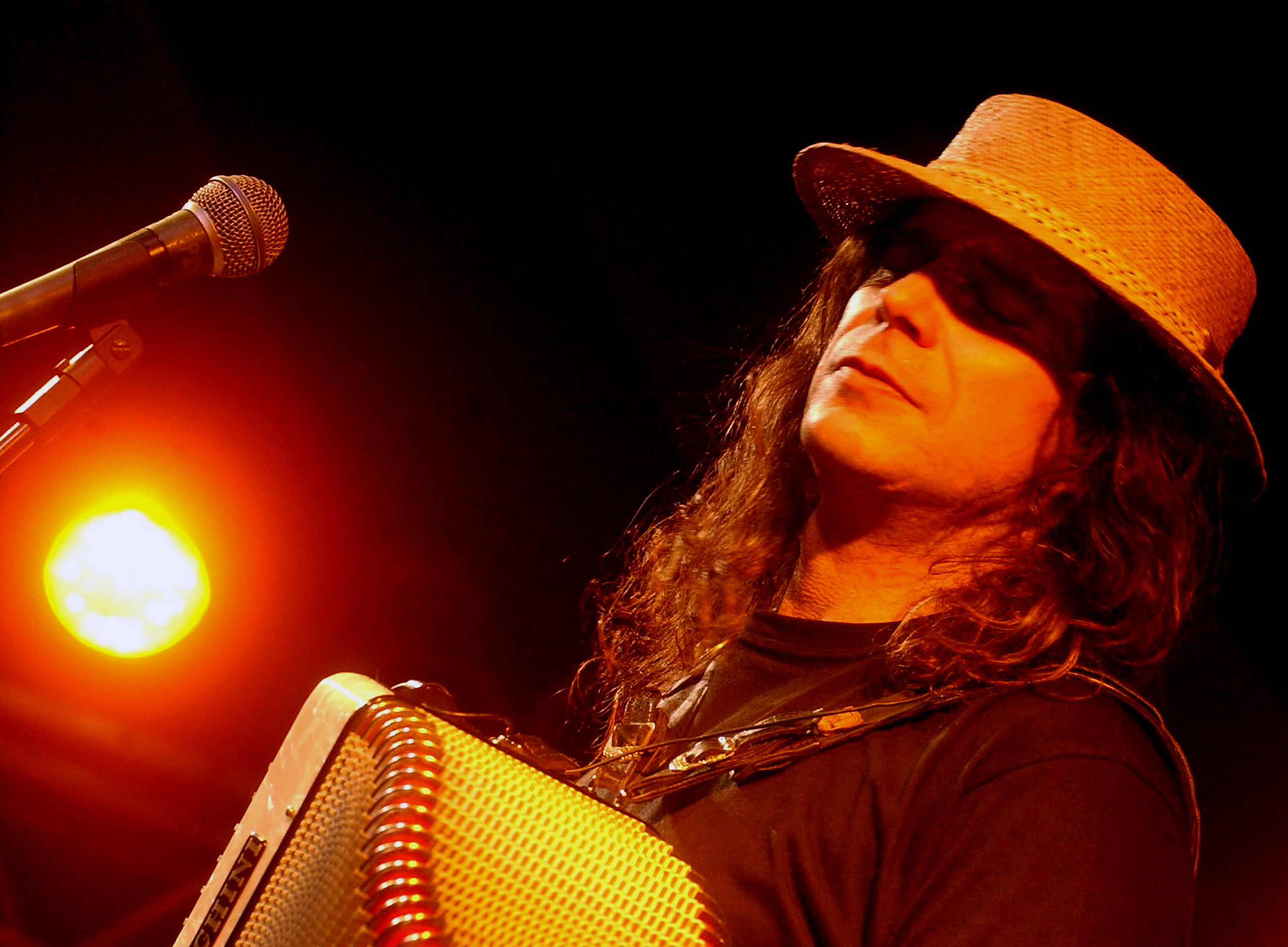
- Renato Borghetti (Photo: Wilson Dias/ABr, Brasília, 2006)

Background information
- Born: Renato Borghetti; July 23, 1963 (age 63); Porto Alegre, Rio Grande do Sul, Brazil
- Genres: Gaúcho; Folk; Chamamé; Milonga; Vanerão
- Occupations: Musician; Composer
- Instrument: Gaita-ponto
- Years active: 1980s–present
- Labels: Som Livre; RGE
- Website: www.renatoborghetti.com.br

Renato Borghetti (born July 23, 1963) is a Brazilian folk musician and composer.

== Career ==
Borghetti was born in Porto Alegre. He works in many genres including traditional styles from his home state of Rio Grande do Sul, other styles of Brazilian music like samba, and international genres like jazz and European classical music. His main instrument is the diatonic button accordion (gaita). He won a Latin Grammy in 2005 for Best Brazilian Roots/Regional Album, for his album Gaita Ponto Com.

In 2009 he performed at the Womex festival.

== Discography ==
- 1984 - Gaita Ponto - RNS Discos
- 1985 - Renato Borghetti - Som Livre
- 1987 - Renato Borghetti - RCA Victor
- 1988 - Esse tal de Borghettinho - RCA/BMG-Ariola
- 1989 - Renato Borghetti - Chantecler/Continental
- 1990 - O Melhor de Renato Borghetti - Som Livre
- 1991 - Borghetti - Continental
- 1992 - Pensa que Berimbau é Gaita? - RBS Discos
- 1993 - Renato Borghetti - RGE
- 1993 - Instrumental no CCBB (with Hermeto Paschoal) - RGE
- 1994 - Accordionist - Prestige Records
- 1995 - As 20 Melhores de Renato Borghetti - RGE
- 1996 - Gaúcho - RGE
- 1998 - Gauderiando - RGE
- 1999 - Ao Ritmo de Tio Bilia - RBS Discos/Som Livre
- 2001 - Paixão no Peito
- 2002 - Ao Vivo em Viena
- 2002 - Umberto Petrin & Renato Borghetti - Reunião
- 2002 - SESC São Paulo - A Música Brasileira Deste Século Por Seus Autores e Intérpretes
- 2005 - Gaitapontocom
- 2005 - Gaúchos (Quinton Recorde Viena)
- 2007 - Fandango
- 2011 - Andanças - Live in Brussels - Saphrane
- 2016 - Gaita na Fábrica - Sounds from the Squeezebox Factory - Saphrane
