= Flutina =

Free-reed musical instrument

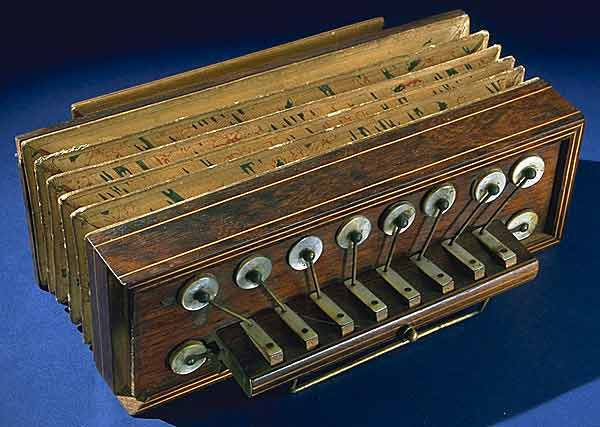
- Classification: Free reed aerophone

The Flutina is an early precursor to the diatonic button accordion, having one or two rows of treble buttons, which are configured to have the tonic of the scale, on the "draw" of the bellows. There is usually no bass keyboard: the left hand operates an air valve (silent except for the rush of air). A rocker switch, called a "bascule d'harmonie" is in the front of the keyboard. When this switch is thumb activated, it would open up a pallet (a pad that covers a tone hole, at the other end of the key button(s), (see photo) for a simple Tonic/Dominant drone: Tonic on the draw and Dominant on the press, e.g. Tonic notes C/g, and Dominant G/d, without any major or minor thirds.

Many of these "Flutina" accordions were imported into the United States and were common photographers' studio props. This imparted a touch of "culture" to the sitter, hence the many tintype, ambrotype, etc. images of men and women, with their hands poised over "Flutinas", which they may (or may not) have actually played. Many of the images date from the 1850s through the American Civil War period (1861–1865).

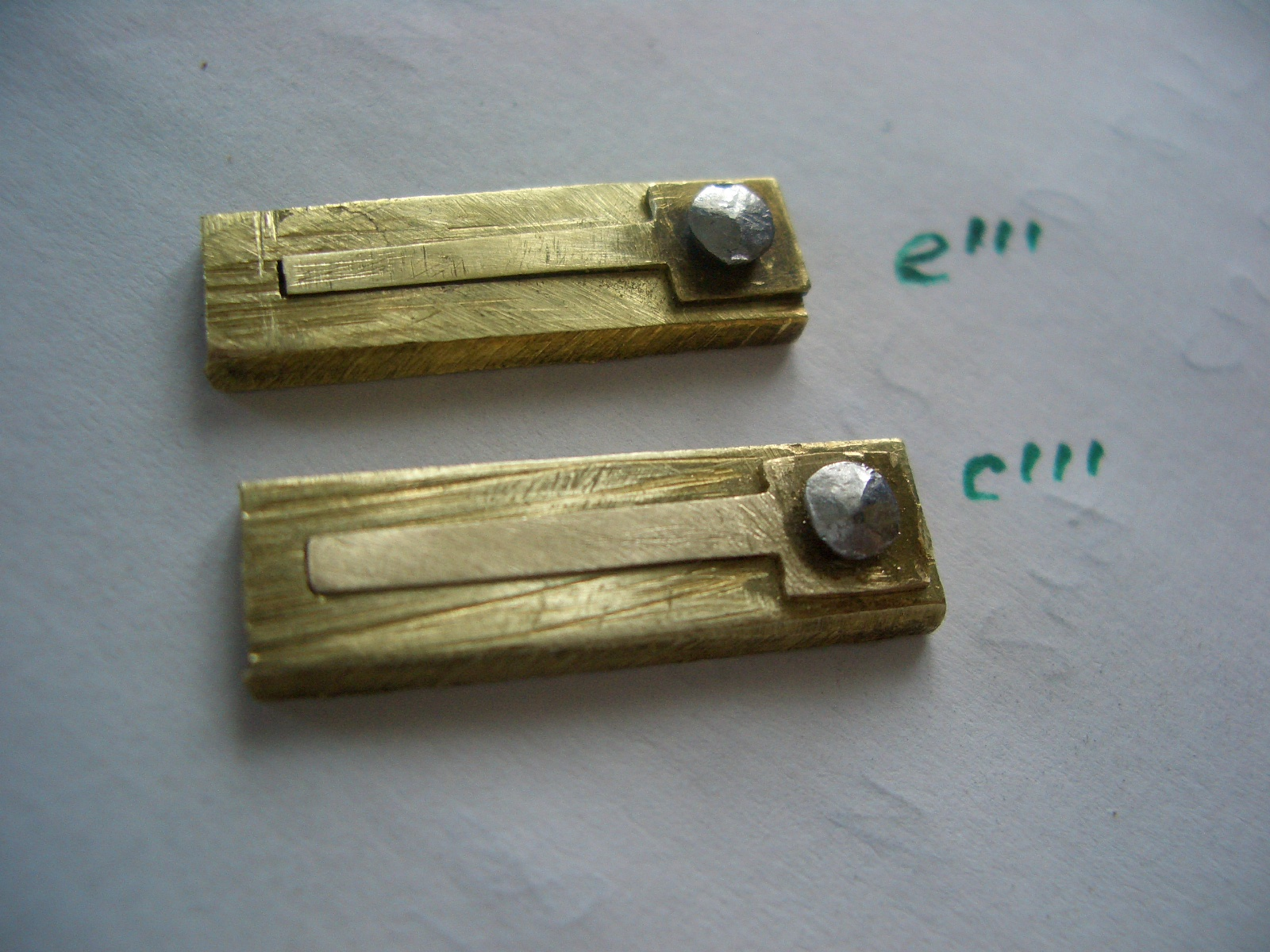
Flutina reeds

The internal construction of the flutina resembles the English Wheatstone concertina more than the "reed banks" used in regular accordion construction. Thus, it has a concertina-like sound. Underneath the pallet/keyboard face, there is a rectangular, wooden board, reed pan, with reed chambers, made with airtight, leather covered, thin wooden dividers. These dividers are between the reeds, for the diatonic scale notes. The brass reed tongues are mounted on reed shoes, with each tongue nailed on with a single metal pin. These reed shoes (or frames) are inserted into dovetail-shaped slots into the top side of the pan. If the keyboard has two rows of keys, the outside row plays the diatonic scale, while the inside row plays the sharps and flats, and these chromatic reeds face the interior of the bellows, in dovetailed slots on the backside of the pan board, without any dividers. The face of the pallet/keyboard actually slides out to reveal the inset reed pan, reminiscent of the construction of a pencil box, or a Japanese puzzle box. The accordion bellows has a very short "throw" (the maximum extension of the bellows, when drawn out), with most instruments having only four folds. Larger versions had 5 to 7 folds in the bellows. The use of the 4 fold bellows made the duration of the note played very short, and the volume of the note comparatively soft, in contrast to the later "German" style accordions, with their larger, multi-fold bellows.

== The name "flutina" ==
The term "flutina" is actually a more specific English name for a version of the accordéon diatonique, accordéon mélodique, clavier (keyboard) mélodique, or even accordéon romantique. Instrument makers of the 19th century often invented many distinct names for all these "new" versions of the same instrument. In addition, English musical instrument dealers would switch the brass reeds out of the French instruments, and replace them with steel reeds. Then, these English dealers would stamp their own company name inside the instrument, or the stamp of the specific store that was selling the accordion. This was a common practice in the 19th century and has continued to be used by many reputable, as well as disreputable, musical instrument dealers.

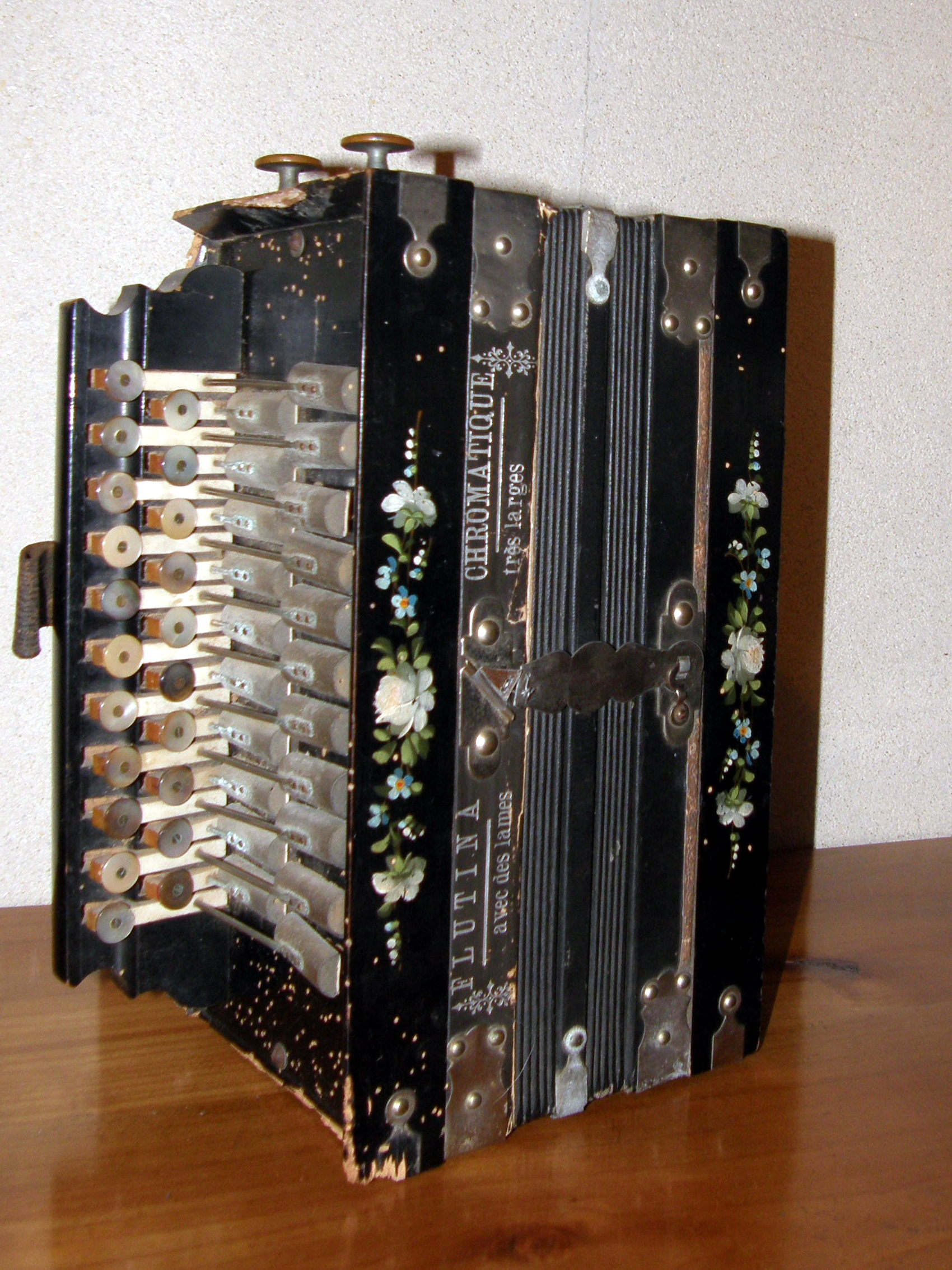
Flutina 1870/1880

All these names, which the French makers gave these instruments, have the pallets on the outside, but the name "Flutina" implies an accordion with the pallets opening on the interior side of the face, just above the buttons, and the air exiting from a narrow slot in back of the protruding keyboard. This feature was supposed to give a more "flute-like" tone to the reeds. Whether the French makers ever used the name "Flutina" is not known.

== History ==
The earliest version was known as the Clavier Melodique ("melodious keyboard"), circa 1831. It was made by Pichenot Jeune ("Young Pichenot"), and was probably one of the first accordions capable of playing a melody. The first recorded factory was that of Napoleon Fourneaux in Paris.

The Accordion of Cyril Demian (1829) described in his Austrian (at Vienna) patent application, had 5 pallets with 10 chords (musical triads) available. It all depended on which direction the player moved the bellows. One key pressed down had 2 chords: one chord on the "press" (in) and the other chord, on the "draw" (out). Demian also produced some Accordions with a single note per button "on the draw" or, "on the press". One of his models, had single notes and two rows of keys: first row the diatonic scale, the second row played the accidentals. The accordion tutor published in the Year of 1833 by Adolph Müller (Austrian National Bibliotheca) has an example which includes pictures and descriptions of many different models. A music journal of Paris, printed in the year of 1831, has many details about the beginning of accordion production in Paris. The article starts out with the statement that the first accordion was copied from a Demian instrument, and later, Demian invented many different scale systems, but only later French models had some buttons in the second row being divided in the middle. More information about it, is in the German Wikipedia. "de:Französisches Akkordeon" text. Note: After Demian's 1829 patent, there is some controversy about the exact dates of further inventions, and the times of applied manufacture, of accordions. Thus, opinions differ, somewhat, among musical instrument historians.

== Accordion notices ==
1837, an advertisement in the musical news paper „LE MENESTREL“ of M. Reisner, selling accordions. By 1845, There were many makers of accordions, listed in various journals: Alexandre, Fourneaux, Jaulin, Lebroux, Neveux, Kasriel, Leterme, Reisner, Busson, M. Klaneguisert. All of these makers sold two different models at that time: one without any chromatic accidentals (a diatonic one row or two row system), and one two rows of buttons with accidentals (diatonic outside row/chromatic inside row.)

A single scale system for these accordions was not universally adopted: Many competing "key layouts" existed. These variations offered slightly differing advantages to the player, and were "championed" by the different manufacturers. layout link

Later versions of the "Flutina" had a few open (tonic and fifth) chords available on the bass side, in addition to the silent "air" key. The most famous maker of these "flutina" accordions was Busson of Paris. Busson also is thought to have had a part in the development of the piano accordion (circa 1880s). The heyday of the "Flutina" was approximately from 1840 to 1880. In the United States of America, the more robust steel-reeded German Melodians "won out" over these brass-reeded, soft, and delicate "accordion melodiques". French "accordion" manufactures nearly came to an end during the Franco-Prussian War 1870-71. From 1880 on, the Italian accordion makers took over a large share of the French market for accordions.

== See also ==
- Bandoneon
