= List of popular music acts that incorporate the accordion =

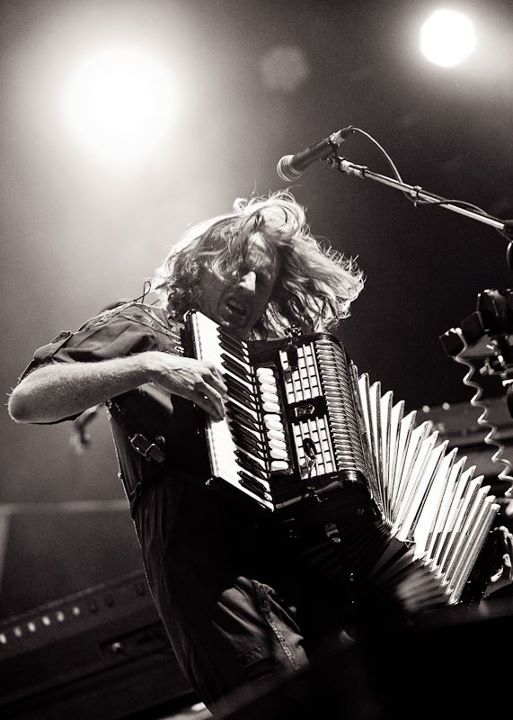
Richard Reed Parry performing with Arcade Fire.

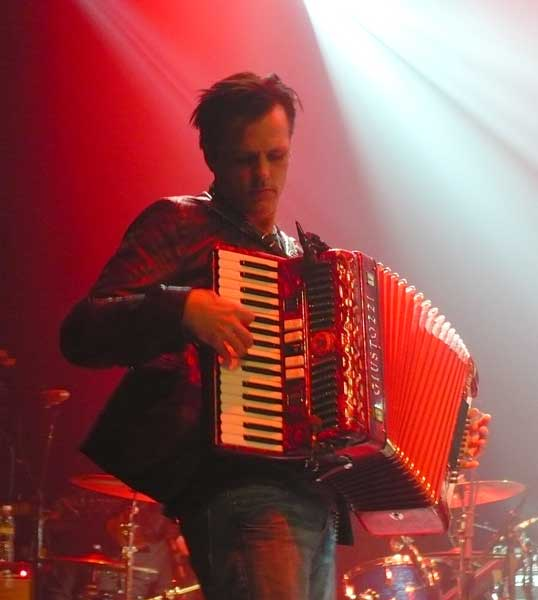
Charlie Gillingham playing the accordion

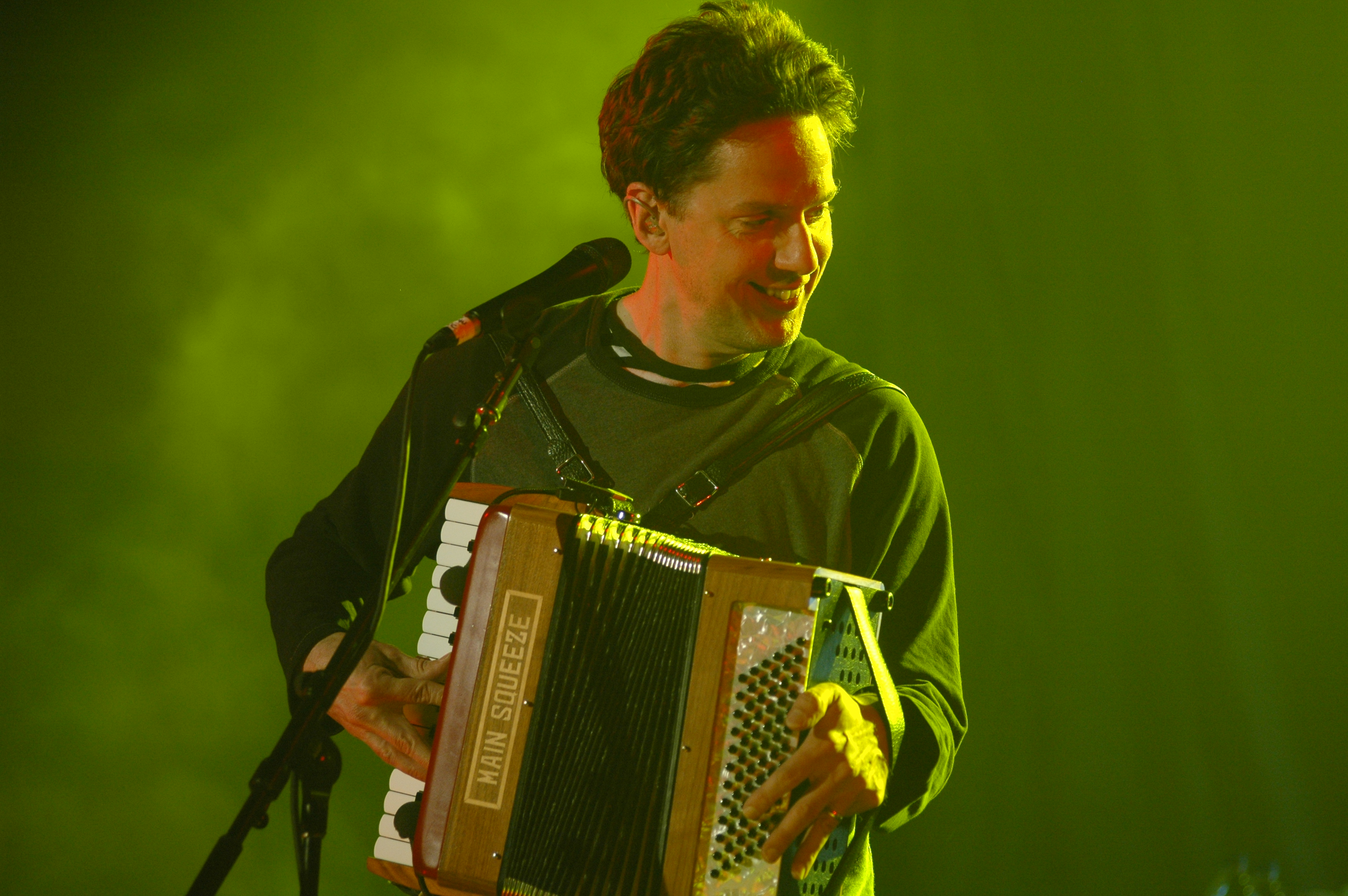
John Linnell performing with They Might Be Giants on a Main Squeeze 911 accordion in Fort Lauderdale on March 12, 2008

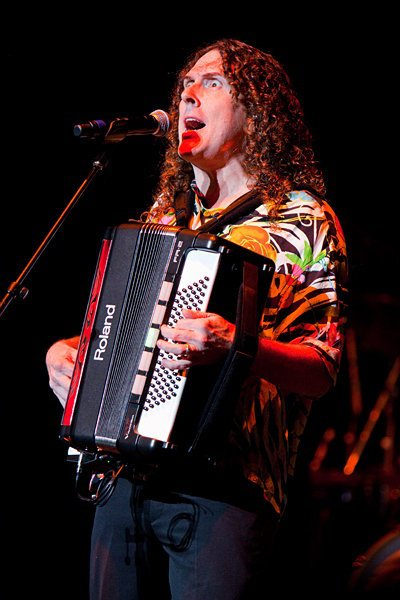
"Weird Al" Yankovic playing a Roland FR-7 V-Accordion

This is a list of articles describing popular music acts that incorporate the accordion. The accordion appeared in popular music from the 1900s-1960s. This half century is often called the "Golden Age of the Accordion." Three players: Pietro Frosini, and the two brothers Count Guido Deiro and Pietro Deiro were major influences at this time.

Band or musician	Accordionist	Style
Abnoey Park	"Captain" Robert Brown	Steampunk
Arcade Fire	Régine Chassagne; Richard Reed Parry	Indie rock
The Band	Garth Hudson	Americana
Barenaked Ladies	Kevin Hearn	Alternative rock
The Beach Boys	Various session musicians	Rock
Beirut	Perrin Cloutier	Combines elements of Eastern European and folk sounds
Brave Combo	Carl Finch	polka/rock/worldbeat band, incorporates a number of dance styles, mostly polka, but also some Latin American and Caribbean styles
Calexico	Martin Wenk	Rock
Counting Crows	Charlie Gillingham	Rock
Silvestre Dangond	Juancho De la Espriella	Vallenato, Modern and very popular Colombian music
The Decemberists	Jenny Conlee	Folk rock
Detektivbyrån	Anders Flanders	Combination of electronica and folk.
DeVotchKa	Tom Hagerman	Indie rock
Alan Doyle	Todd Lumley	Folk/Country/Rock
The Dreadnoughts	Leroy "Slow Ride" McBride	Folk punk, polka punk, celtic punk
The Dropkick Murphys	Tim Brennan	Celtic punk
Dubioza Kolektiv	Brano Jakubović	Bosnian dub-rock
Elaiza	Yvonne Grünwald	Folk, indie rock, alternative rock
The E Street Band	Danny Federici; Roy Bittan; Charles Giordano	Rock
The Felice Brothers	James Felice	Folk/country rock
Finsterforst	Johannes Joseph	Folk metal, Viking metal
Flogging Molly	Matt Hensley	Celtic punk
Folkearth	Polydeykis (Zion)	Viking metal, folk metal, black metal
Jason Freese	Self	Alternative rock, pop punk, punk rock, garage punk
Gogol Bordello	Yuri Lemeshev	Gypsy punk, folk punk
Great Big Sea	Bob Hallett	Traditional Newfoundland folk and rock
Haydamaky	Ivan Leno	Ukrainian folk punk
The Hooters	Rob Hyman	Rock
Bruce Hornsby	Bruce Hornsby	Rock. Played accordion at various Grateful Dead concerts.
Huntza	Josune Arakistain Salas	Basque folk punk
Jump, Little Children	Matthew Bivins	Combines Irish influences with an alternative rock sound
Kalevala	Alexander Oleynikov	Folk metal
Katzenjammer	Anne Marit Bergheim	Pop, folk rock
Mark Knopfler	Phil Cunningham; Jim Cox; Iain Lothian	Blues Rock, Roots Rock, Celtic Rock, Folk Rock. Accordion included on most solo albums (since 1996), plus various collaboration and soundtrack projects.
Kongos	Johnny Kongos	Alternative rock
Korpiklaani	Juho Kauppinen	Folk metal
Lemon Demon	Neil Cicierega	Indie rock
Leshak	Игорь "Hurry" Ангиоз	Folk metal, death metal
Los Colorados	Unknown	World rock
Los Lobos	David Hidalgo	Rock and roll, Tex-Mex, country, zydeco, folk, R&B, blues
Lucero	Rick Steff	Alternative country, Punk rock, Alternative rock, Heartland rock, Memphis soul, Blues rock
Mägo de Oz	Sergio Cisneros	Folk metal, folk rock
Madvillain	Madlib	Hip hop
The Mahones	Katie McConnell (Katie Kaboom)	Irish folk, Punk rock, Rock
John Mellencamp	Unknown	Rock. Has included the accordion in most of his music since The Lonesome Jubilee.
MewithoutYou	Aaron Weiss	Alternative rock
Mekons	Eric Bellis aka Rico Bell	Alternative rock
Molotov Jukebox	Natalia Tena	Gypstep
Moonsorrow	Henri Sorvali	Folk metal
Motion Trio	(Accordion Trio)	Collaborations with other artists (such as Bobby McFerrin and Michał Urbaniak)
My Superhero	Mike Berault	Ska punk
Neutral Milk Hotel	Julian Koster	Indie rock
Maria Ney	Self	Weimar German cabaret performer
NOFX	Eric Melvin	Punk rock
Oingo Boingo	Steve Bartek, John Avila, Doug Lacy	New wave, dance-rock, ska, alternative rock
The Pogues	James Fearnley	Irish punk, pub music
The Radioactive Chicken Heads	Punky Rooster	Punk rock, comedy rock
Random Encounter	Careless	Alternative rock, indie rock
Rotfront	Unknown	Dub, ska, world music
Scythian	Danylo Fedoryka	Folk, Celtic, Celtic rock, folk rock, Americana
Czeslaw Spiewa	Czeslaw Mozil, Martin Bennebo	Combines elements of Eastern European and folk with pop and alternative rock
Sound Horizon	Revo	Combination of many genres, ranging from heavy metal to classical
Steam Powered Giraffe	Isabella "Bunny" Bennett	Steampunk, folk rock, vaudeville
Stolen Babies	Dominique Lenore Persi	Experimental rock, avant-garde metal
Styx	Dennis DeYoung	Hard rock, progressive rock
Svartsot	Hans-Jørgen Martinus Hansen	Folk metal, Viking metal
Tesco Value	Czeslaw Mozil, Martin Bennebo	Folk, pop, rock
That Handsome Devil	Jeremy Page and Andy Bauer	Alternative rock, alternative hip hop
They Might Be Giants	John Linnell	Alternative rock
Those Darn Accordions	Various, currently Paul Rogers and Suzanne Garramone	Accordion-based rock/pop/comedy band
Yann Tiersen	Self	French, avant-garde
Tiger Lillies	Martyn Jacques	Brechtian and modern cabaret
Tosca Tango Orchestra	Glover Gil	Nuevo tango, classical music
Turisas	Janne Mäkinen, Netta Skog	Folk metal, Viking metal
Twenty One Pilots	Tyler Joseph	Alternative rock, indie pop
The Twilight Sad	Andy MacFarlane	Scottish folk rock, indie rock
Varang Nord	Jeļena Kaļniša	Folk metal, Viking metal
Vitas	Vitas (studio), unknown (live)	Eclectic Russian pop
Julieta Venegas	Self	Latin pop
Vopli Vidopliassova	Oleh Skrypka	Ukrainian folk punk, folk rock
Tom Waits	William Schimmel, David Hidalgo	Jazz, rock, blues, folk, experimental rock
Jason Webley	Self	Combination of traditional music, Romani music, punk rock
Weddings Parties Anything	Mark Wallace	Folk rock
Windir	Valfar	Folk metal, Viking metal, black metal
Wintergatan	Martin Molin	Folktronica
The World/Inferno Friendship Society	Franz Nicolay	Cabaret punk
"Weird Al" Yankovic	Self	Comedy music, parody music
The Zydepunks	Juan Küffner	folk punk
