= Utrecht Guild of Saint Luke =

Two artist collectives in Utrecht; the Saddler's Guild and Sint Lucas Gilde

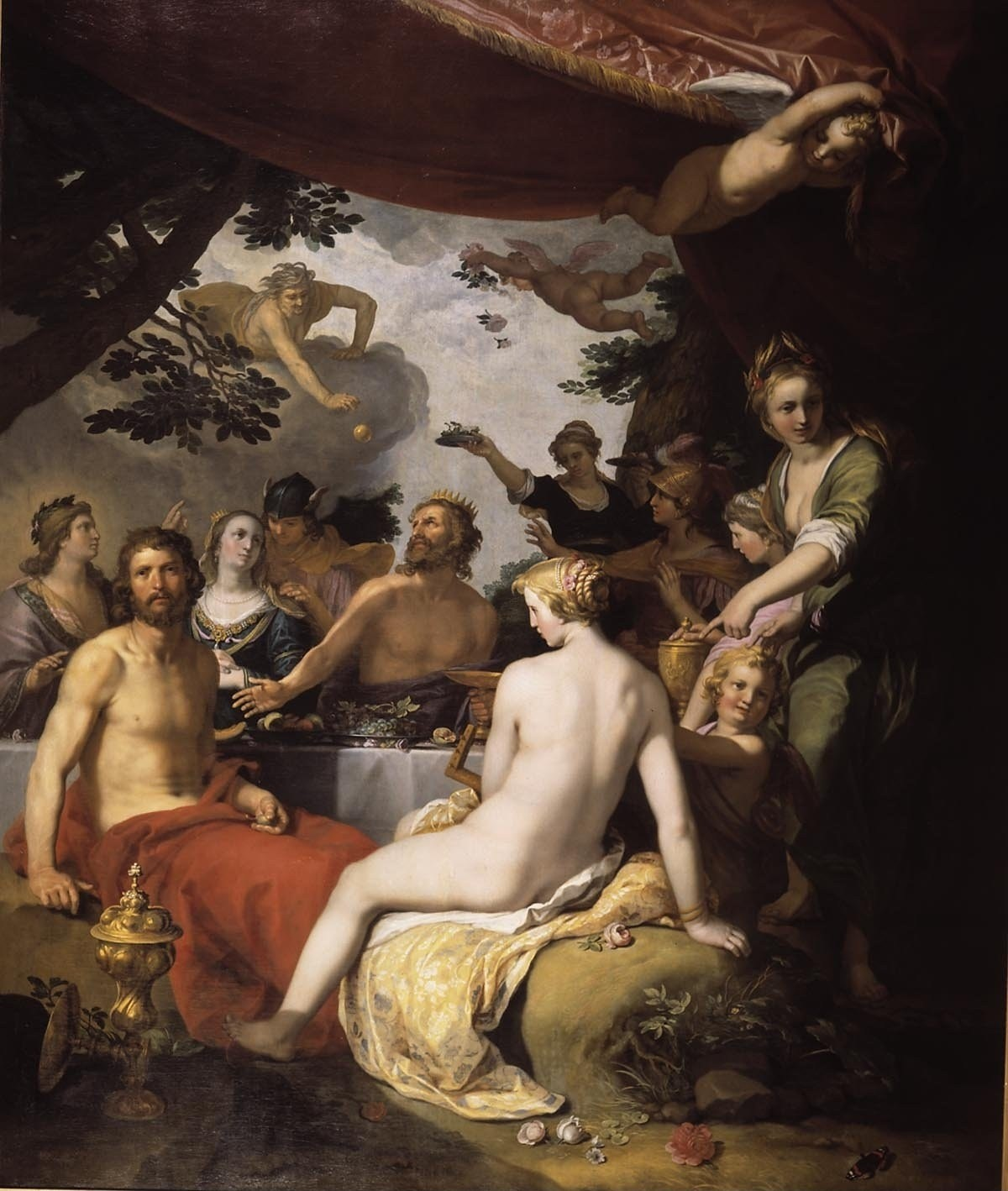
Abraham Bloemaert painted this feast of the gods at the wedding of Peleus and Thetis in 1638.

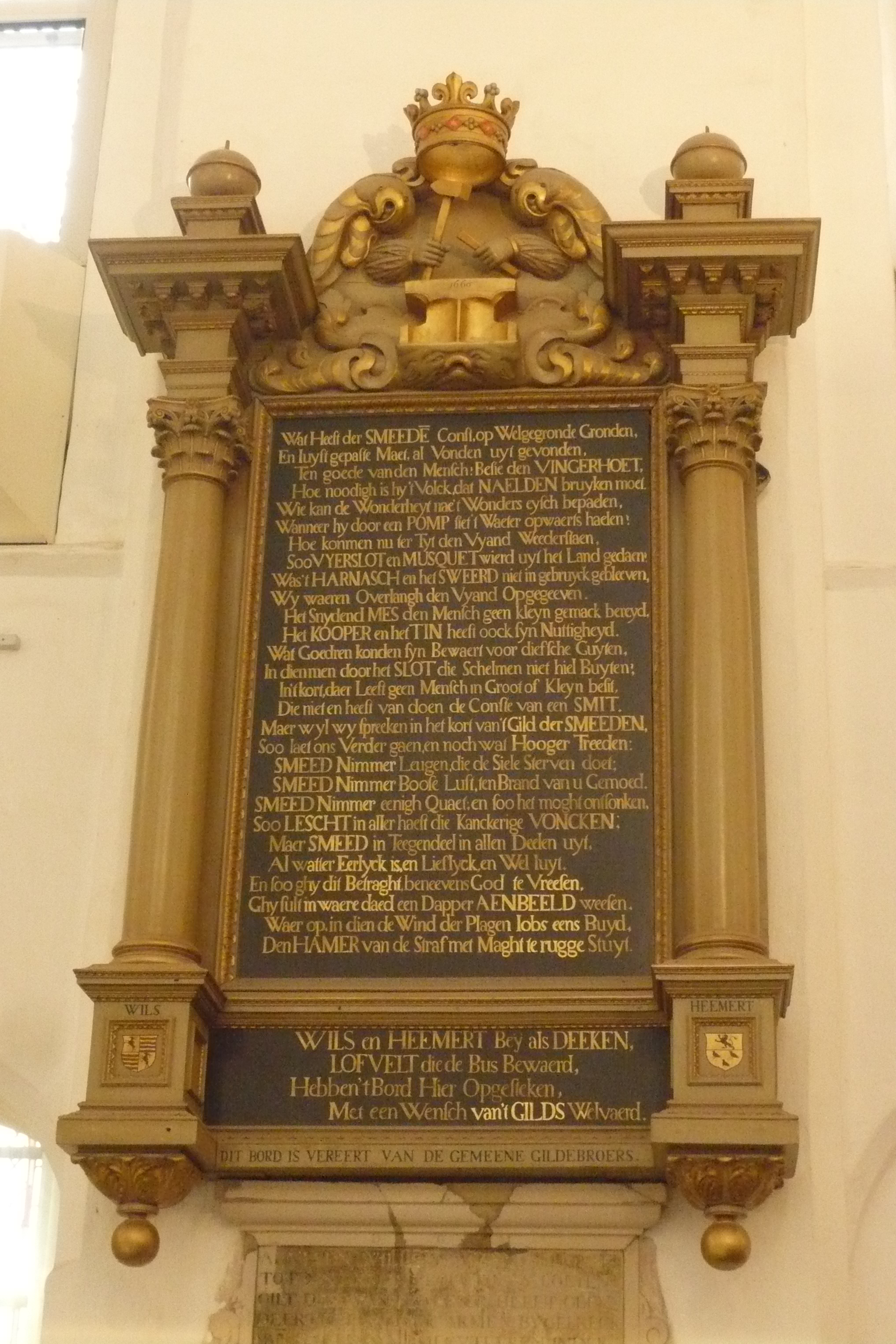
Plaque in memory of the Smith's guild in the Buurkerk (now the Museum Speelklok)

The Utrecht Guild of Saint Luke refers to two artist collectives in Utrecht (city); the old Catholic Zadelaarsgilde (Saddler's Guild) dating from the Middle Ages, as well as the newer Sint Lucas Gilde established in 1611. The first guild was for a number of trades that were connected to the art industry, though the smiths had their own guild called the "St. Eloyen" guild. The second collective was founded for visual artists after the Protestant Reformation. The Zadelaarsgilde fell under the patron saint Luke the Evangelist and the St. Eloyen guild fell under Saint Eligius.

== History ==
Like other Dutch cities, Utrecht required membership in the guilds in order to sell wares falling under those guilds. In the 14th century, the Utrecht saddlemakers, painters, sculptors, book illustrators, and bookbinders were all united in the Zadelaarsgilde. In those days oil painters were just as likely to paint on leather parchment or harness as on wooden panels or sculptures, so the choice of trades united in this guild is not so strange. Utrecht in the Middle Ages was the largest city in the Northern Netherlands, capital of the Bishopric of Utrecht, and the main center for religion. With each passing of an archbishop, a new archbishop would be appointed who brought his own artisans to town. Utrecht was thus an important art center and saw many innovations in the arts in general over the centuries. The smiths were split into guilds, one for the gold- and silversmiths under St. Eligius, and one for the bronze, iron and tin workers (including lock-, knife-, and clock makers) in the Smeden guild. All three guilds existed well before the 14th century and were led by two "dekens" (deacons or aldermen), and they were associated with different churches.

During the course of the 17th century this slowly changed. The oil painters were reorganized under the leadership of Abraham Bloemaert into the Sint Lukasgilde, while the smiths's guilds were united under the St. Eloyengasthuis (St. Eloy's Hospice) and led by the regents of that institution. In 1639 the oil painters were again reorganized into the Schilderscollege, which effectively forced out the sculptors. In 1717 the city council changed the formula from a guild to a society, and membership was no longer required. The task of the society was mostly the running of the drawing school called the Stadstekenacademie that had been held in the St. Hieronymusschool since 1696. In 1814 the name changed again, and it became the Painting and Drawing Society "Kunstliefde". The title means "love of art" and the members tended to apply themselves to the fashionable art of imitating the Dutch masters from the 17th century.

Today the society is housed on Nobelstraat 12a in Utrecht.

== Guild members registered in Utrecht ==
Some notable members of the Utrecht Guild of Saint Luke (or Zadelaarsgilde) were Balthasar van der Ast, Dirck van Baburen, Abraham Bloemaert, Hendrick Bloemaert, Johannes van Haensbergen, Hendrick ter Brugghen, Steven van Herwijck, Gijsbert d'Hondecoeter, Gerard van Honthorst, Nikolaus Knüpfer, Paulus Moreelse, Herman Saftleven, Roelant Savery, Jan Vermeer van Utrecht, Jan Weenix, Jan Baptist Weenix, Abraham Willaerts, Adam Willaerts, Joachim Wtewael, Charles Cornelisz. de Hooch, Johannes van Wijckersloot.
