= Jamstik =

Brand of portable MIDI guitars

Jamstik™ is a brand of portable, app-connected (MIDI) guitars made by Zivix, a music technology company based in Minneapolis, MN. The original Jamstik and Jamstik+ guitars were designed in Minneapolis and manufactured by a contract manufacturer based in South Dakota, United States. In 2020 the full 24 fret Jamstik Studio MIDI Electric Guitar was released, with electronics made in the US and guitar built in China, in 2024 the Jamstik Standard and Deluxe the guitars are made in China as are the new Jamstik Core guitars in 2025. The Strandberg Jamstik Chameleon announced at NAMM 2026 is built by PT Cort in Indonesia, with the MIDI Electronics and design done in Minneapolis, MN,

== Media coverage & awards ==
One of the earliest public media demonstrations of the Jamstik was in January 2013 on the TechCrunch stage at the Consumer Electronic Show in Las Vegas.

Although it was not released until 2014, Jamstik was recognized by Popular Science as one of the most innovative inventions of 2013.

The original Jamstik received a "Best In Show" award from the North American Music Merchants (NAMM) trade show in 2014.

== Product variations ==
Jamstik (Original WiFi edition)

The original Jamstik was launched in 2014 on Indiegogo, raising over $175,000 from nearly 850 supporters. It connects to an iPad, iPhone, or Mac via WiFi and is primarily used through its compatible apps, Jamstik and JamTutor, although it is also compatible with other music apps like GarageBand, Animoog. The device features 6 strings, 5 frets, weighs 1 lb 9 oz, and includes infrared transmitters that sense the player's finger positions on the fretboard. This feature helps players determine if they are playing the correct notes. Jamstik comes with three free mobile apps, including JamTutor, an instructional app designed to teach the basics of guitar through arcade-like games and challenges.

Jamstik+ (Bluetooth version)

In 2015, Zivix raised over $813,000 on Kickstarter to fund the second generation of the Jamstik, known as the "Jamstik+". This model became the second most successful crowdfunding campaign from Minnesota. The Jamstik+ introduced several upgrades, including Bluetooth LE MIDI support (replacing WiFi), hammer-on/pull-off support, and the ability to connect multiple devices to the same iPad or laptop.

Jamstik 7

In May 2018, Zivix launched the third-generation "Jamstik 7" on Indiegogo. To celebrate the success of its crowdfunding campaign, Zivix announced that it would donate 2% of the total funds raised during the campaign to The NAMM Foundation's Bill Collings Memorial Fund, which supports education for students and guitar teachers. Additionally, Zivix committed to donating 1% of future retail sales from the new products as an ongoing contribution to support the Foundation.
