= Wermland (album) =

Studio album by Detektivbyrån
- Released: 3 September 2008
- Recorded: January–May 2008; Gothenburg, Sweden
- Genre: Folktronica, Pop
- Length: 39:46
- Label: Danarkia

Detektivbyrån chronology
E18 Album (2008)	Wermland (2008)	Beyond (unreleased)

Wermland is the second album by Detektivbyrån released on the band's own label Danarkia. In contrast to the band's debut/compilation album E18 Album, Wermland features only new content. Prior to the album being available for purchase, the band made the songs "Om Du Möter Varg" and "Neonland" available on their website. During the autumn of 2008 the album reached the third place in the Swedish charts of album sales.

== Track listing ==
1. "Om Du Möter Varg" - 3:08
2. "Kärlekens Alla Färjor" - 3:09
3. "Honky Tonk Of Wermland" - 2:15
4. "Rymden I En Låda" - 2:25
5. "Generation Celebration" - 3:01
6. "Life/Universe" - 3:21
7. "Neonland" - 3:10
8. "Hus Vid Havet" - 2:10
9. "Partyland" - 3:28
10. "Camping" - 2:43
11. "Sista Tryckaren" - 2:50
12. "En Annan Typ Av Disco" - 3:00
13. "Dygnet Runt" - 1:04
14. "054" - 4:02

== Critical reception ==
As the band was active in Sweden the album was predominantly reviewed by Swedish newspapers and magazines.

Olle Sjögren of Norrländska Socialdemokraten begins his review of Wermland by noting that the album's "shining gold-metallic artwork with measured typography [...] could have been part of a luxury PR-campaign from Louis Vuitton." He also notes that "Detektivbyrån separate themselves from other folktronica artists by allowing the folk music to play a big part". Olle concludes the review by writing "Detektivbyrån's Wermland is so far the prettiest approach to integrating Swedish folk music with modern electronic elements, without coming close to the awful Nordman and Sarek."

The review in Norran by Per Strömbro beings with "An improbable debut, improbably good that is." About the genre he writes "they offer intrinsically Swedish instrumental music with particularly contagious accordion and synth melodies." Per concludes his text with "One of this year's big debuts."

Nancy Baym of Scandinavian music journal "It's a trap" provides one of few English language reviews where she notes that "the sheer fun of their sound has won them and an enthusiastic following. 'Wermland' [...] is fun." She also writes "it demonstrates impeccable melodic pop sensibility." And closes with "This serious contender for album of the year will sounds just as good decades from now."

In the Swedish music magazine Groove, Per Lundberg GB wrote "With Wermland Detektivbyrån continues to embrace the melancholy. [...] While on their way they meet up with Cougar and Aphex Twin. Wermland is cabaret, pop and folk music in one package."

Some reviews were not entirely positive. Helsingborgs Dagblad referred to the album as "pre-school pop" that "too often veer into accordion-circus-music on drugs". Still the review stressed that "the joy of the music is contagious" and that the best part of the album is its "melancholic, french sound". The review summarized the album as "a 40 minute long lullaby for three year olds".

== Personnel ==
- Jon Nils Emanuel Ekström
- Anders Flanders
- Martin Molin

played drums, accordion, vibraphone, case, drawing pin piano, glockenspiel, clicker, mellotron, music box, pen, scissors, shoes, synthesizer, tele cables, traktofon. Additionally the band composed, produced, mixed, mastered and recorded the album.
