= Grinding Tapes =

Grinding Tapes Recording Company
- Founded: 2005
- Founder: Jason Rozen
- Genre: Indie folk
- Country of origin: United States
- Location: Boston, MA
- Official website: Grindingtapes

Grinding Tapes Recording Company is an independent record label that documents Boston's indie folk music scene. Grinding Tapes releases are usually recognizable due to their unique jacket style, which usually consists of recycled cardboard screen printed with a single-color design.

== Philosophy ==
Grinding Tapes' philosophy is deeply rooted in the do-it-yourself ethic and political awareness championed by D.C.'s Dischord Records and Montreal's Constellation Records. Grinding Tapes' detailed mission statement outlines the label's commitment to charitable donations, recycled packaging, revenue transparency, and environmentalism. The label founder, Jason Rozen, is also known to have donated one of his kidneys to Grinding Tapes artist, Elijah Wyman.

Grinding Tapes was interviewed by Ed Rand on the "Middleboro Midday" talk radio show on April 16, 2010.

== Roster ==
Grinding Tapes artists include Detektivbyrån, Elijah Wyman, The Points North, Mr. Sister, (The) Slowest Runner (in all the World), Vinegar Socks, The Woodrow Wilsons, and Hello Shark.
