= Charles Cornelisz. de Hooch =

Dutch painter (c. 1600–1638)

Charles de Hooch
- Born: Charles Corneliszoon de Hooch c. 1600; Probably Haarlem, Dutch Republic (now the Netherlands)
- Died: 2 July 1638; Utrecht, Dutch Republic (now the Netherlands)
- Movement: Dutch Golden Age; Baroque

Charles Cornelisz. de Hooch (c.1600 – 2 July 1638), was a Dutch Golden Age landscape painter and etcher.

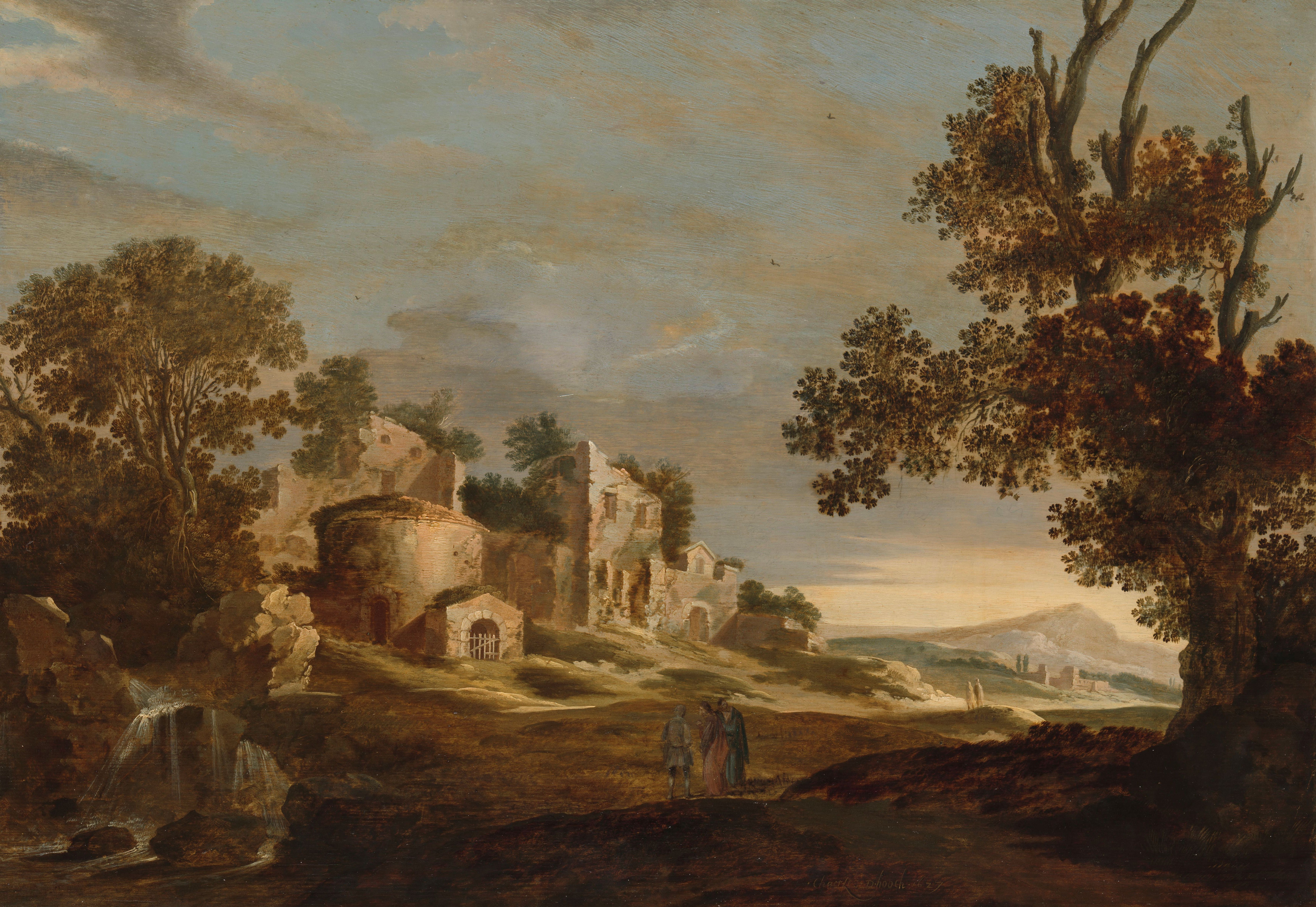
Landscape with Christ on the way to Emmaus, 1627

== Biography ==
He became known as Karel de Hooge from being listed in Samuel Ampzing's lof der Haerlem as a painter of ruins, along with Pieter Molyn, Jacob Pinas and Salomon de Bray, who was born in 1597. He is best known today for his so-called grotto paintings. Grotto painting as an independent genre was probably initiated by a group of followers of Cornelis van Poelenburch, which included De Hooch along with Abraham van Cuylenborch and Dirck Stoop. His contemporaries in landscape painting included Esaias and Jan van de Velde, Pieter Dircksz Santvoort, Pieter Molyn and Salomon Ruysdael.

Charles was probably born in Haarlem, since Ampzing included him, but this is not totally certain. It is accepted that he lived in Haarlem up until 1628, the year of publication of Ampzing's book. Ampzing wrote a whole verse of poetry about him:

En sal ik hier DE HOOG ook niet wel bilijk pogen (And would I hereby deem de Hooch worthy)
Naer sijne waerdigheyd met ere te verhogen? (of enhancing his dignity with praise?)
Wilt gij ruwijnen sien, naer 't leven afgebeeld? (Do you want to see ruins, true to life?)
So siet wat sijne hand en sijne konst hier teeld. (You recognize his mastery and refinement.)

After his Haarlem period he moved to Utrecht, where he died 2 July 1638 leaving underage children. His life can thus be divided in his Haarlem period (from birth up until at least 1628) and his Utrecht period (From 1628 up until his death in 1638). In Utrecht he belonged to a group of painters that included Bartholomeus Breenbergh, Abraham van Cuylenburch, Rombout van Troyen and P. van Hattick.

Charles Cornelisz. de Hooch was married to Claesgen van Thiel (1629-07-11 - 1671-06-20) and they had one son Horatius (? - after 1686) who in turn married Wilhelmina van Swoll.

After he donated a painting to the 'St. Jobs Gasthuis' in 1628, he was introduced into the Utrecht Guild of St. Luke in 1633.

Charles Cornelisz. de Hooch is not the father of the famous painter of interiors Pieter de Hooch, as is often mentioned. C.H.C. Flugi van Aspermont argues that this is not true, though Het schildersregister by Jan Sysmus, doctor of the city of Amsterdam, which was published by Dr. Abraham Bredius in Oud Holland VIII, mentions (p. 222) Karel de Hoogh, vader van Pieter and on p. 307 'Pieter de Hoogh, landschap, utert, redelijk, syn vader hiet Carel'. P. Haverkorn van Rijsewijk writes in Oud-Holland X, p. 172, that he found a testament (dating 21 dec 1657) saying: "Henrick de Hoge, metselaer benoemt SIJN SOON Pieter de Hooch, schilder". Which implies that not Charles Cornelisz. de Hooch, but Henrick de Hoge is Pieter's father. Pieter de Hoogh lived in the same street as Hendrik de Hoogh during his marriage. A Hendrik de Hoogh was a witness during the baptism of Pieter's daughter Anna. Pieter's age coincides with the age on Hendrik's son Pieter's baptising.

== Works and style ==
His works are very rare, but most of them are easily recognised by his distinguished signature.

=== Works of Haarlem Period (1624-1628) ===
The earliest works of de Hooch are dated around 1620, and were produced in Haarlem. These realistic paintings of the Dutch landscape belong, according to Flugi van Aspermont to the oldest school of Haarlem landscape painters, which distanced itself from the Flemish school of landscape painting.

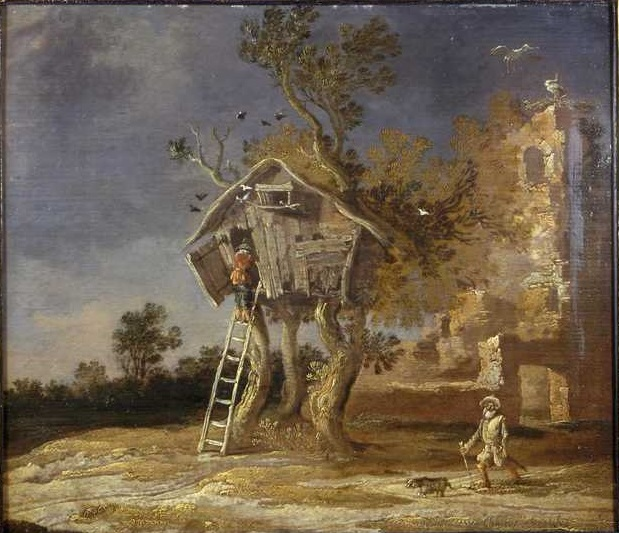
Landscape with Travelers underneath a Dovecote, Monastery on the Right, ca. 1625, panel

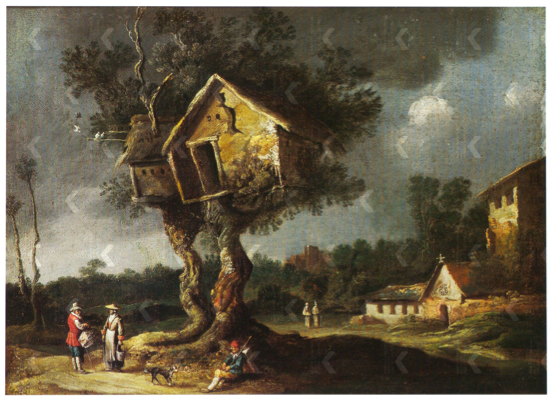
Landscape with Travelers underneath a Dovecote, Monastery on the Right, 1620–28, canvas

An example of one of those landscapes can be found in his Landscape with Travelers underneath a Dovecote. In the centre of this panel there is a wooden dovecote build on three trees; a man in a red shirt and blue pants is standing on a ladder which is placed to it. On the right is a ruin of a castle with a stork's nest. In front of it there is a man accompanied by a dog. In the background there are trees surrounded by a clouded sky. This theme of a dovecote is also painted in a canvas painting in 1628, the year he moved to Utrecht, which de Hooch painted in Haarlem. At the bottom of the right is it signed "Chaerles dhooch"

These two paintings of dovecotes look largely the same in terms of content, with the exception of the buildings in the right side. On the panel this is a ruin of a castle, while on the canvas this is a regular building. De Hooch was particularly admired for his ability to paint ruins, according to Ampzing.

=== Works of Utrecht Period (1628-1638) ===
His Utrecht period is characterized by Italianate landscapes and grotto paintings. The seventeenth century Dutch Italianate grotto painting that is characteristic of De Hooch's Utrecht period owes its inception to Cornelis van Poelenbergh of Utrecht. Poelenbergh traveled to the south and, upon his return to Utrecht in the mid-1620s, he continued to depict Italianate landscapes featuring ruins and grottos. De Hooch was most likely involved in initiating this subject matter as an independent genre, along with other followers of Poelenbergh. De Hooch's Italianate landscapes can be clearly associated with those of Poelenburgh and Breenbergh, however it is not known whether he learned about Italianate motifs on a trip south or from Poelenburgh and Breenbergh after they returned to Holland from their own trips to south. De Hooch is known for his intriguing paintings of dramatically lit and spooky grottos which feature classical sculpture and architectural fragments. In his painting Italian landscape with ruins and duck hunters, which is estimated to be completed sometime between 1630 and 1635, a clear connection to the work of Poelenburgh and Breenbergh can be seen. The simple design of the piece and the "solid, monumental composition is accompanied by firmer, more tangible modeling details".

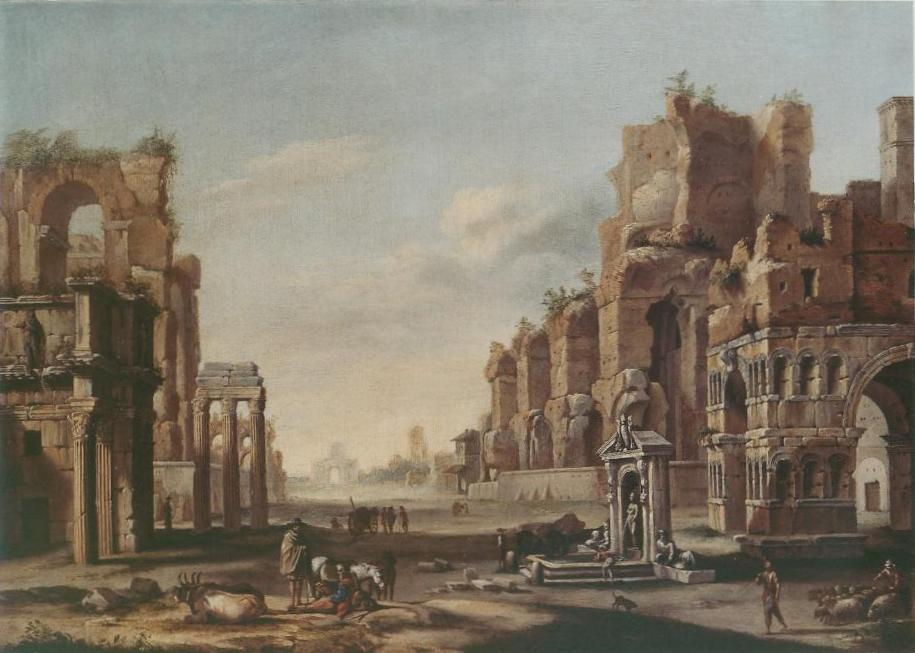
A capriccio view of the roman forum, 1620–1638, Mougins Museum of Classical Art

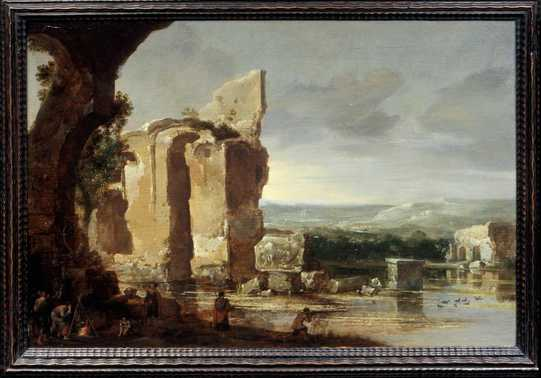
Italianate landscape with ruins and duck hunters, 1630-5, panel

=== Best known works ===
- 'De duiventil - Charles DHooch', Panel 27x32, in Museum Kunstliefde in Utrecht
- 'De grot - Charles D. Hooch f.' Panel, 53x79, in Fredensborg Palace in Kopenhagen
- 'De Catacomben, panel 68x93, in the collection Prince Charles d'Arenberg in Brussel

An interesting case are two landscapes with ruins in Suermondt-Ludwig-Museum of Aken (nr 67 and 68 of their 1883 catalogue), are both wrongly attributed to Pieter de Hooch (according to Dr. Hofstede de Groot), because Pieter never painted landscapes. Although Arnold Houbraken thought that he was a pupil of Nicolaes Berchem, it could be that these were Carel de Hooch's paintings.

== De Hooch family of artists ==
Charles Cornelisz. de Hooch is not the father of the famous painter of interiors Pieter de Hooch, as is often mentioned. C.H.C. Flugi van Aspermont argues that this is not true, though Het schildersregister by Jan Sysmus, doctor of the city of Amsterdam, which was published by Dr. Abraham Bredius in Oud Holland VIII, mentions (p. 222) Karel de Hoogh, vader van Pieter and on p. 307 'Pieter de Hoogh, landschap, utert, redelijk, syn vader hiet Carel'. P. Haverkorn van Rijsewijk writes in Oud-Holland X, p. 172, that he found a testament (dating 21 dec 1657) saying: "Henrick de Hoge, metselaer benoemt SIJN SOON Pieter de Hooch, schilder". Which implies that not Charles Cornelisz. de Hooch, but Henrick de Hoge is Pieter's father. Pieter de Hoogh lived in the same street as Hendrik de Hoogh during his marriage. A Hendrik de Hoogh was a witness during the baptism of Pieter's daughter Anna. Pieter's age coincides with the age on Hendrik's son Pieter's baptising. Charles Cornelisz de Hooch was possibly the brother of Dirck Cornelis de Hooch.
