= Moog Model 15 =

Musical mobile app

- Developer(s): Moog Music
- Initial release: 2016
- Stable release: 2.1.3 / 1 January 2016; 9 years ago
- Operating system: iOS
- Size: 213.6.5MB
- Type: Synthesizer

The Model 15 is a synthesizer and educational tool mobile app designed for iPad, iPhone and iPod Touch. It is a software recreation of a Model 15 modular synth from 1973.

== See also ==
- Moog synthesizer
- Animoog
