= E18 Album =

Studio album by Detektivbyrån
- Released: 2 May 2008
- Genre: Post-rock, Minimalism, Ambient, Indie pop
- Length: 36:39
- Label: Danarkia, P-Vine

Detektivbyrån chronology
E18 Album (2008)	Wermland (2008)

Singles from E18 Album
- 1. "Lyckans Undulat" Released: 6 June 2007

E18 Album is the debut album by the band Detektivbyrån released by the Japanese label P-Vine under license from the band's own label Danarkia. It may also be viewed as a compilation album as it mainly contains all the songs from the EP Hemvägen and the single "Lyckans Undulat". Also included on the album is the song "Laka-Koffa", previously released in May 2007 on a limited 500 copies 7" vinyl single "Detektivbyrån - Hemstad" accompanied by the song "Tuff Ungdom" by Hemstad. The song "Home Sweet Home", which is a variant of "Hem Ljuva Hem", was previously unreleased.

The album name E18 Album is a likely homage to the European route E18 that passes through the city of Karlstad, Värmland where the band members grew up.

== Track listing ==
1. "E18" - 3:29
2. "Hemvägen" - 4:03
3. "Nattöppet" - 3:20
4. "Monster" - 2:49
5. "Dansbanan" - 3:49
6. "Granmon" - 2:19
7. "Vänerhavet" - 4:06
8. "Lyckans Undulat" - 2:52
9. "Hem Ljuva Hem" - 2:15
10. "Home Sweet Home" - 1:23
11. "Laka-Koffa" - 6:14
