= Johannes van Wijckersloot =

Dutch Golden Age painter

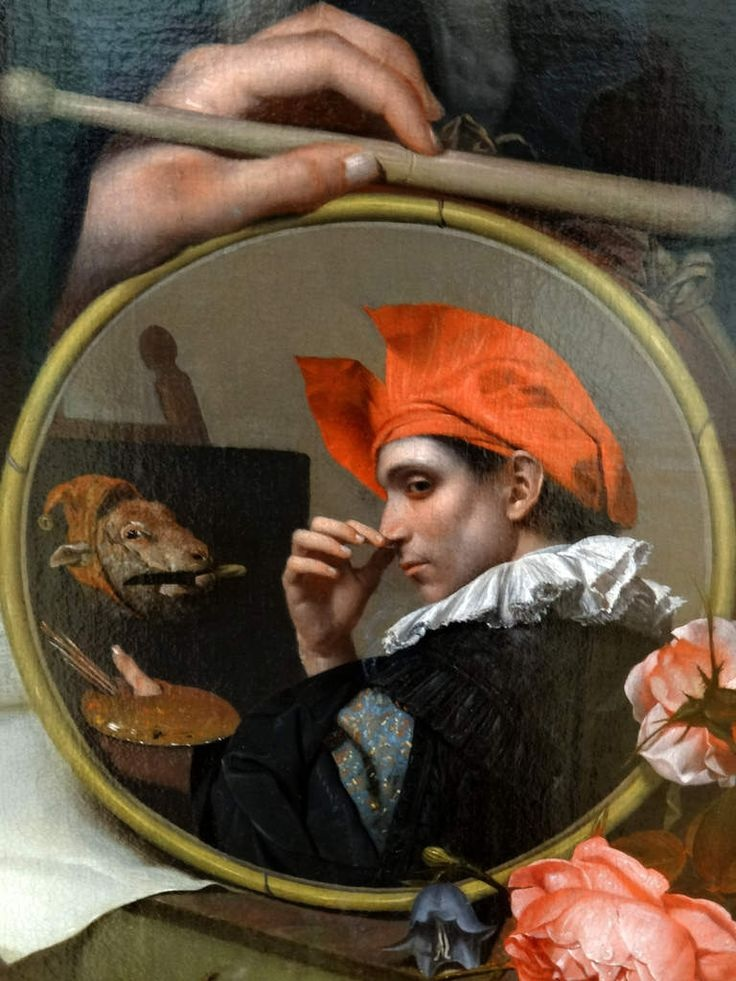
- Self-portrait (detail)
- Born: c. 1625-1630; Utrecht
- Died: 4 November 1687 (aged 56–62); Amsterdam

Johannes van Wijckersloot (c. 1625-1630 – 1687) was a Dutch Golden Age painter.

Wijckersloot was born in Utrecht and little is known of his early years, though he probably learned to paint at the newly opened drawing academy there. He worked his way up in the Utrecht Guild of Saint Luke, becoming headman in 1658. He is known for portraits and allegories. His most famous painting is possibly his 1672 allegory of the Rampjaar, in which he painted a representation of the Garden of Holland with a sleeping lion. The motif of the lion in the Garden of Holland became a common symbol in heraldry, asleep or standing victorious with a phrygian cap. Wijckersloot moved to Amsterdam in 1684 where he later died.

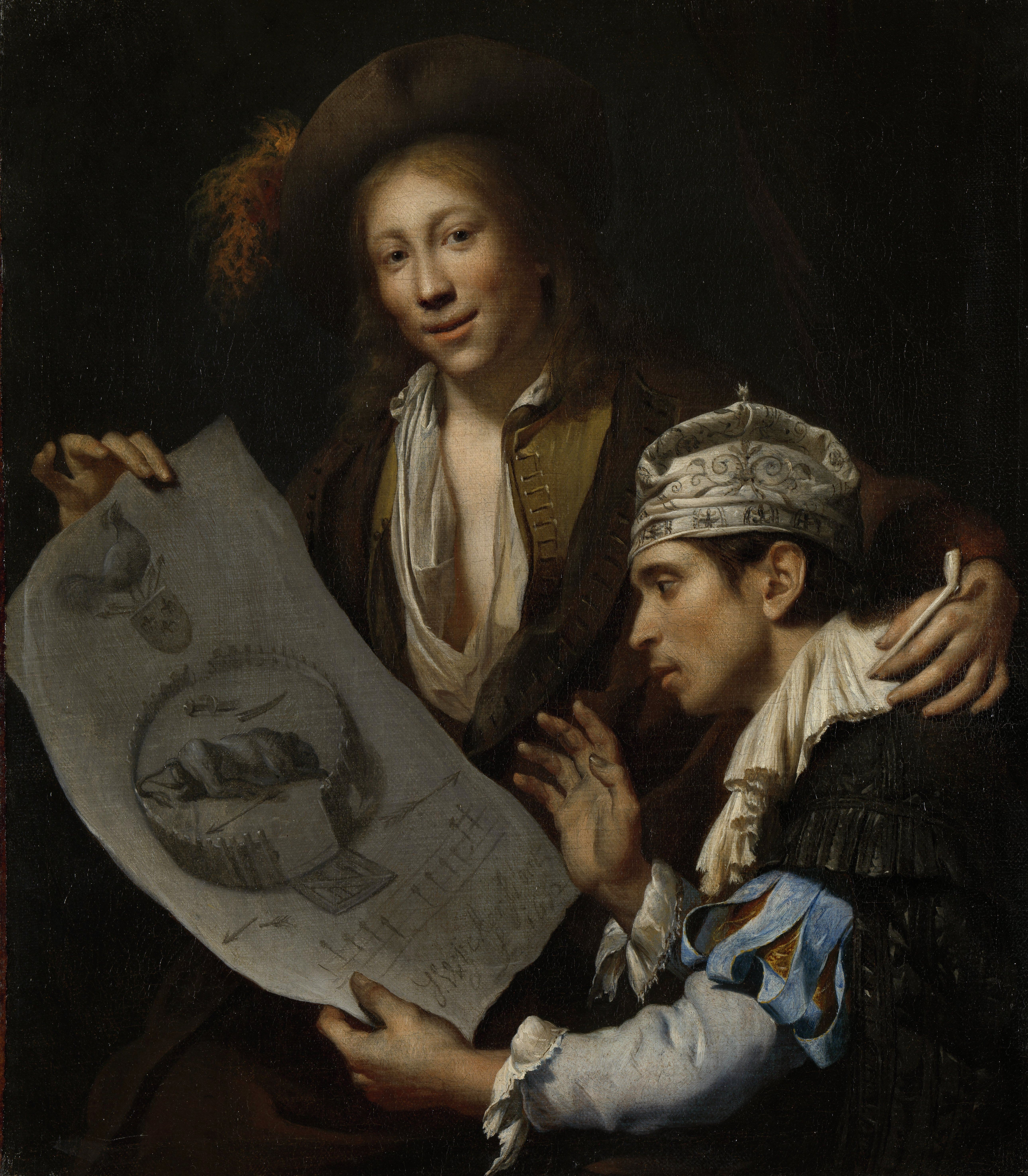
Rampjaar

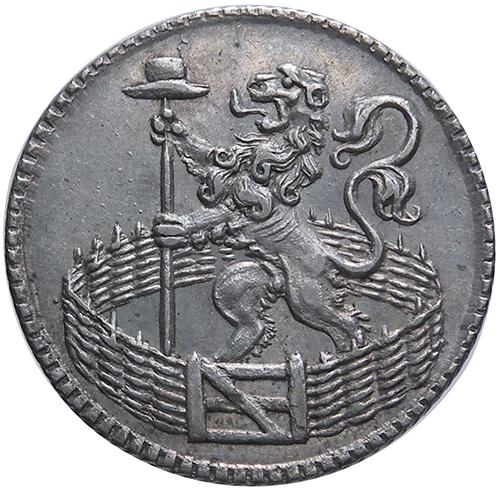
Dutch coin, 1753
