= Buurkerk =

Coordinates: 52°05′26″N 5°07′9″E

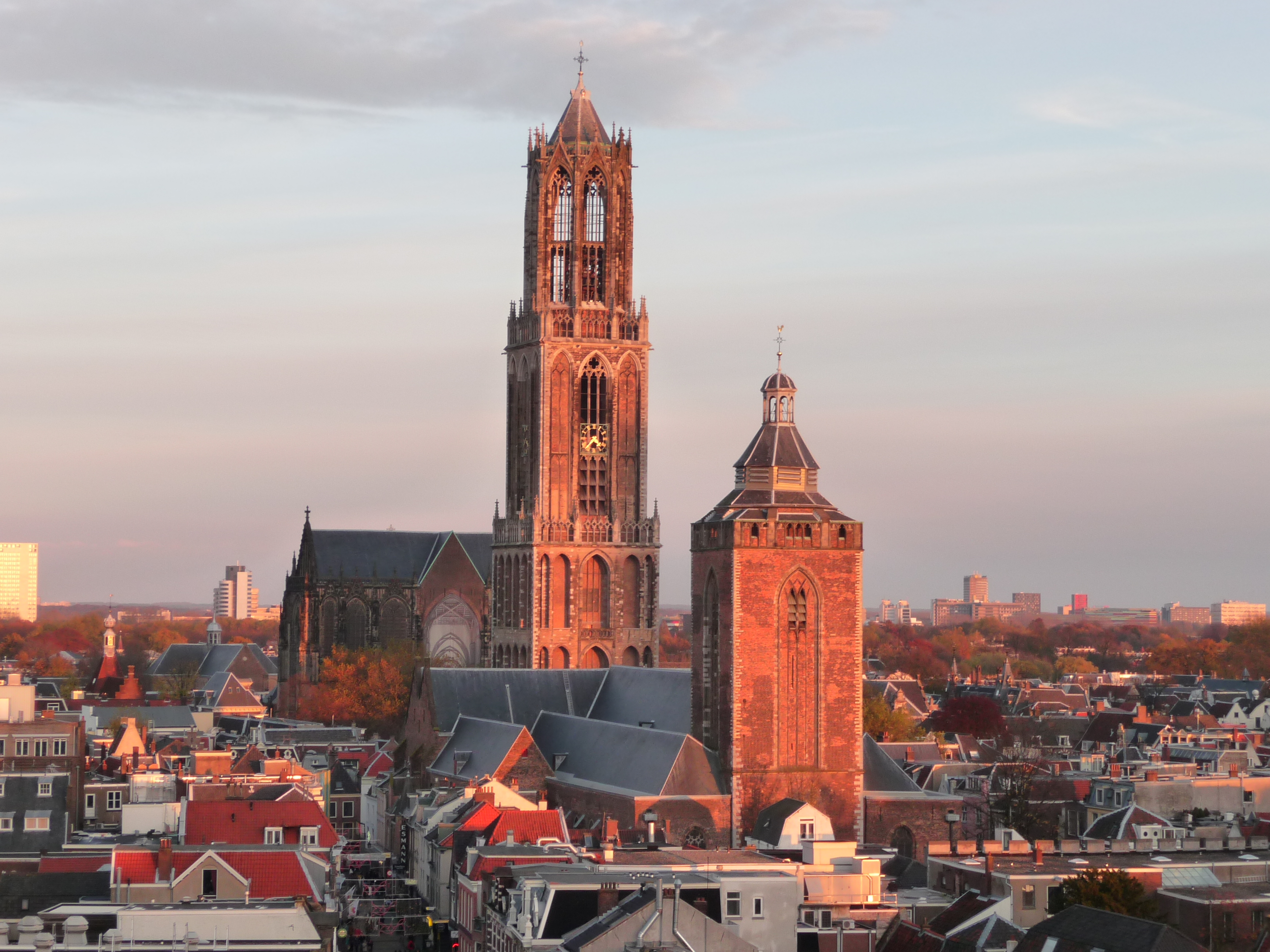
The Buurkerk (seen in the foreground)

The Buurkerk is a former church building in Utrecht (city), Netherlands on the Buurkerkhof. The building is the location of the Museum Speelklok, and the entrance is on the Steenweg. It is one of the medieval parish churches of Utrecht, along with the Jacobikerk, the Nicolaïkerk and the Geertekerk.

== History ==
The building is documented as being burned in 1131, 1173, 1253 and 1279. The tower dates from 1370, but was never finished. In 1577 a cannon was installed in the church tower, aimed at the Vredenburg castle where the Charles V's Spanish soldiers there were under siege by the Utrecht schutters. Around 1580 the church endured the protestant reformation and in 1586 it was formally handed over to the protestants, who whitewashed the wall decorations and removed the choir to make room for a street. The Choorstraat, which is named after the deconstructed choir, still has the outlines of the old choir in the pavement. In 1975 the church fell into religious disuse. The building has functioned as a museum since 1984.

== Etymology ==
The name Buurkerk is made up of the words buur (neighbour) and kerk (church). In the 10th century, after the winding down of a tumultuous period of hostile Viking raids, trade in the Low Lands became safer and thus more profitable. Cities such as Utrecht were able to thrive starting in the 10th century. The flourishing economic activity resulted in a wealthier and larger population.

The newly built church building was located in what was then the city centre. The town hall, street markets, and the court house were all located in a dense area to the west of the Buurkerk. Prominent citizens, politicians, and guild members would gather on the square to the west of the church for general business and matters of governance. The 'neighbour church' became a physical symbol for social, economic, and political development. Eventually a small raadskapel (council chapel) was built as part of the church's structure for more formal meetings.

== Burials ==
The church is the burial place of various notable Utrechters such as the 17th-century painters Joachim Wtewael, Paulus Moreelse, Hendrick ter Brugghen, Dirck van Baburen, Jan Both and Herman Saftleven. Their graves are no longer marked however.

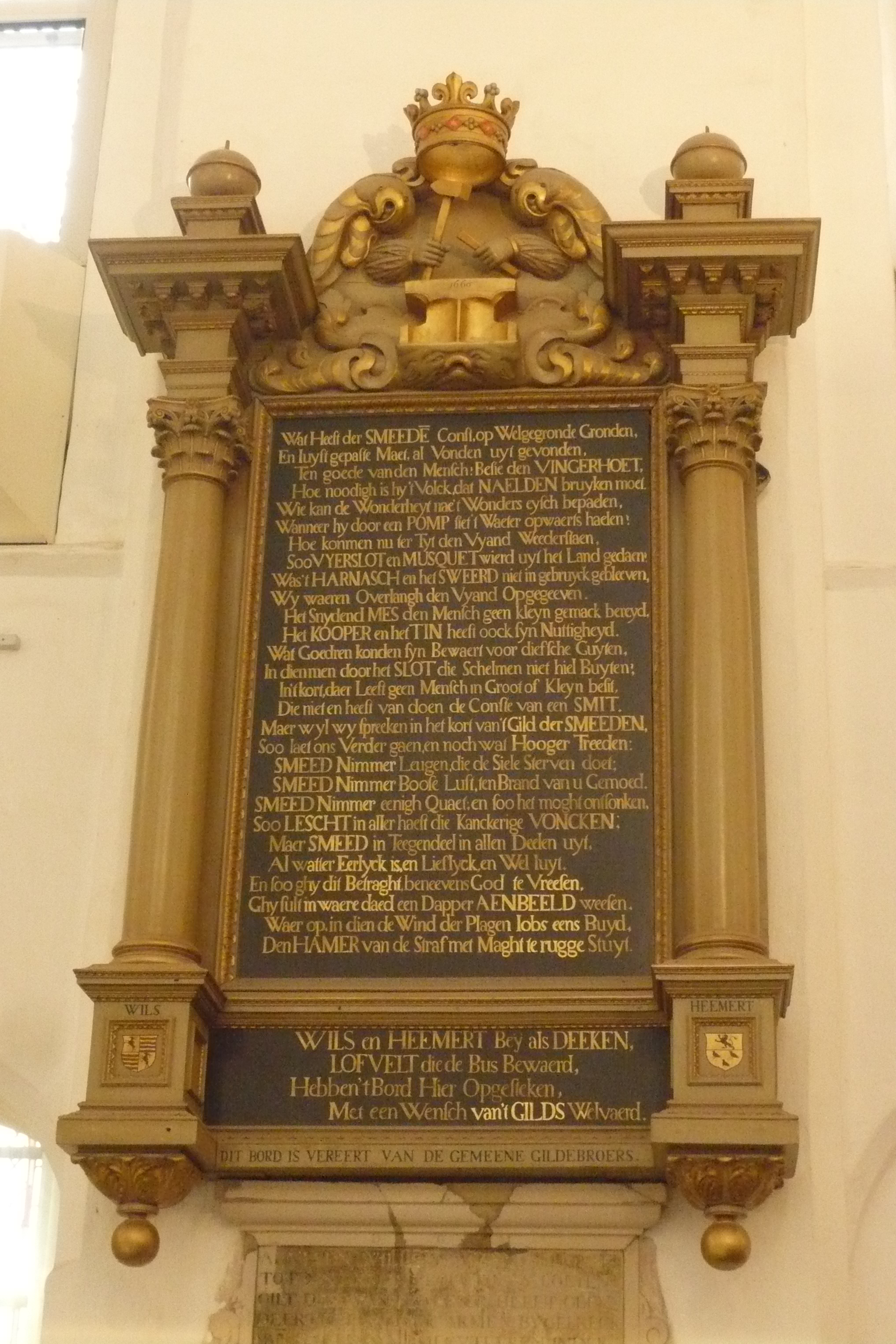
Plaque in memory of the Smith's guild near the entrance

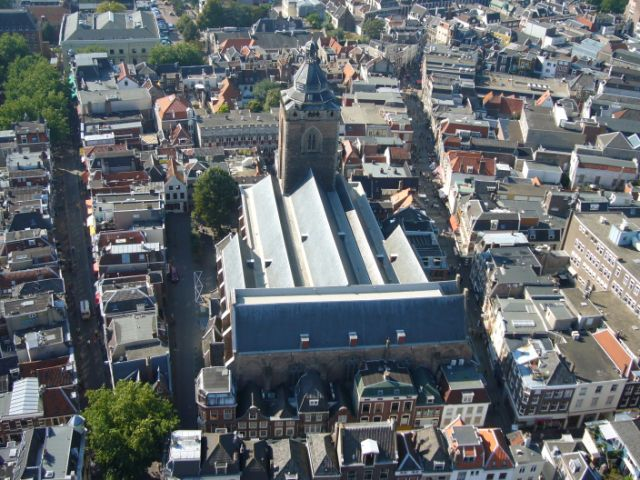
View of the Buurkerk from the Dom Tower of Utrecht
