= Wintergatan (album) =

Studio album by Wintergatan
- Released: 24 April 2013
- Genre: Folktronica, experimental pop, indietronica, post-rock
- Length: 44:08
- Producer: Martin Molin

Wintergatan is the debut album from eponymous Swedish folktronica band Wintergatan, released on 24 April 2013.

== Track listing ==
All music is composed by Wintergatan

No.	Title	Length
1.	"Sommerfågel"	3:53
2.	"The Rocket"	3:32
3.	"Valentine"	3:59
4.	"Slottskogen Disc Golf Club"	3:33
5.	"Biking is Better"	3:28
6.	"Västanberg"	4:26
7.	"Starmachine2000"	4:03
8.	"All Was Well"	3:03
9.	"Paradis"	14:11
Total length:		44:08

Professional ratings
Review scores
Source	Rating
Sputnikmusic	4/5 stars
Pinpoint Music	4/5 stars

== Credits ==
Wintergatan

- Martin Molin – vibraphone, music box, accordion, keyboards
- Evelina Hägglund – keyboards
- David Zandén – bass, keyboards
- Marcus Sjöberg – drums
