= Wintergatan =

Swedish folktronica band

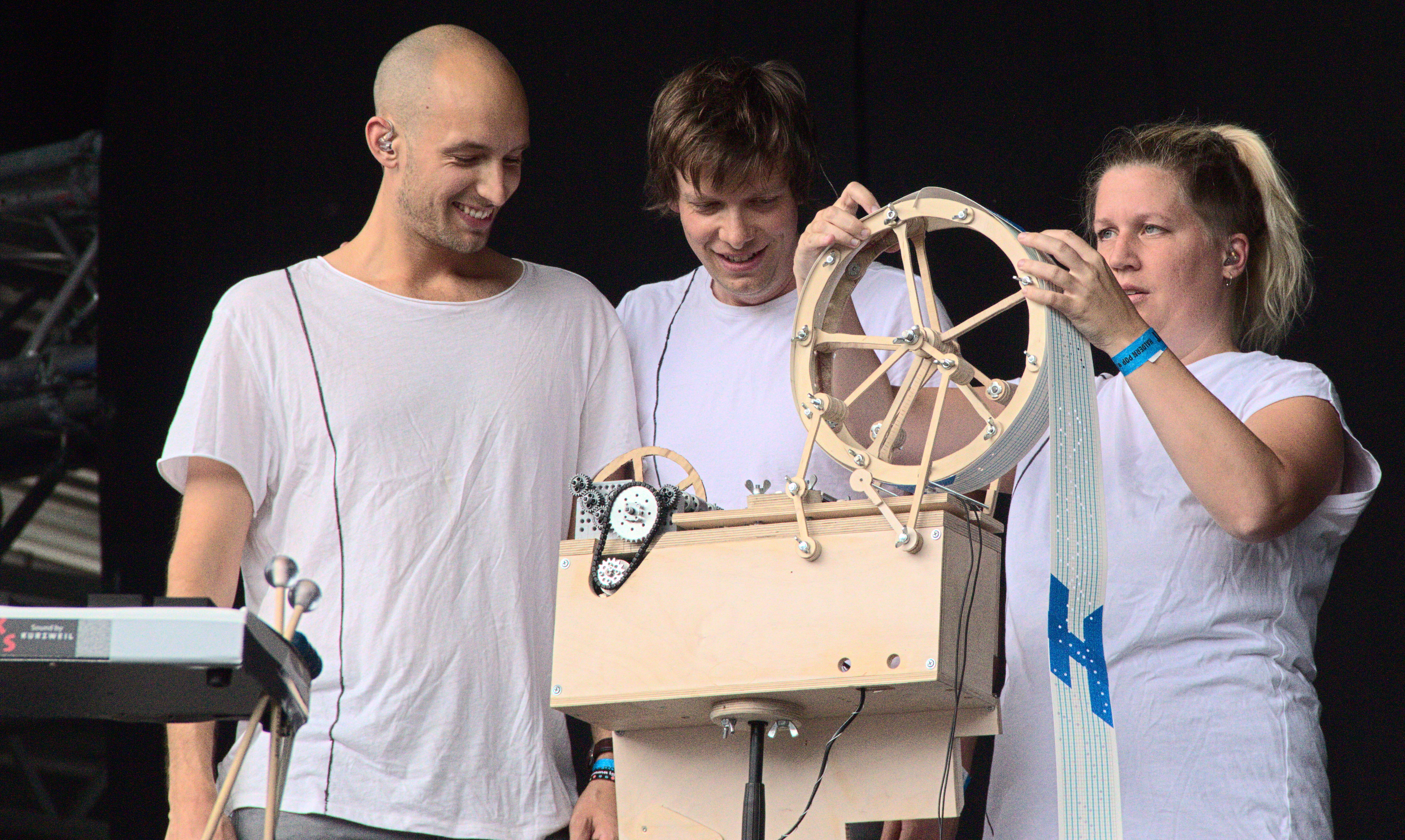
- Wintergatan at Haldern Pop Festival 16 in Haldern, Germany

Background information
- Origin: Gothenburg, Sweden
- Genres: Folktronica; experimental pop; post-rock
- Years active: 2012–present
- Members: Evelina Hägglund; Martin Molin; Marcus Sjöberg; David Zandén
- Website: wintergatan.net

Wintergatan (Swedish pronunciation: [ˈvɪ̂nːtɛrˌɡɑːtan], "the Milky Way", lit. '"the Winter Street"') is a Swedish folktronica band from Gothenburg. Two members—Martin Molin and Marcus Sjöberg—were previously part in a former band Detektivbyrån.

Wintergatan released their first track in late 2012, titled Sommarfågel, and their debut album Wintergatan in 2013. The band toured Sweden with the album in 2014 and 2016; Julia Jonas was substituted for Evelina Hägglund during some 2014 performances.

== Members ==
Wintergatan consists of four musicians, Martin Molin, Evelina Hägglund, David Zandén, and Marcus Sjöberg. The band's members play various instruments but have primary specializations. Molin specializes in performing on the vibraphone as well as electronic instruments which define Wintergatan's sound, Hägglund specializes in keyboard instruments, Zandén in bass, and Sjöberg specializes in playing drums.

== Instruments ==
The band uses a variety of unconventional instruments including the Modulin, a ribbon controlled synthesizer built from Doepfer eurorack modules in the likeness of a violin, the Moog Theremini digital theremin, an electric autoharp, a hammered dulcimer, a self-built punch-card music box, a slide projector, a musical saw, and a typewriter for use as percussion.

== Marble Machine ==
"Marble Machine"
27-second sample

From December 2014 to March 2016, the band uploaded several YouTube videos featuring Martin Molin documenting the construction of a music box which uses marbles to play instruments. The machine is powered by a hand-crank, and works by raising steel marbles through the machine into multiple feeder tubes, where they are then released from height via programmable release gates, each marble falling and striking a musical instrument below. Instruments played by marbles striking them include a vibraphone, bass guitar, cymbal, an emulated kick drum, hi-hat, and snare drum sounds using contact microphones. The music score is stored on two programmable wheels which utilize Lego Technic beams and stud connectors to trigger armatures to release the marbles. A final music video showing the machine in use was released in 2016, and has been viewed over 275 million times.

Ten months after the debut of the original Marble Machine, the band announced their plans to make a new marble machine for the purpose of touring. The new machine, to be called "Marble Machine X", would solve a multitude of mechanical functionality problems with the original Marble Machine. Martin Molin, the builder of the original Marble Machine, collaborated with a team of engineers and designers as well as fans for the design and build of the Marble Machine X. The original Marble Machine came back into his possession after being exhibited in Museum Speelklok in Utrecht, the Netherlands. Molin stopped building the MMX at the end of 2021 after realizing the design would not be robust or reliable enough to go on tour with. The first two machines have been donated to a museum for mechanical music machines in Germany called "Siegfried's Mechanical Music Cabinet" and in March 2022 he started to design a third version, with the series name being called Martin vs the Machine.

== Discography ==
=== Albums ===
- Wintergatan (2013)
- Live At Victoriateatern (2017)

=== Singles ===
- "Sommarfågel" (2013)
- "Starmachine2000" (2013)
- "Tornado" (2013)
- "Biking Is Better" (2013)
- "All Was Well" (2013)
- "Visa från Utanmyra" (2014)
- "Marble Machine" (2016)
- "Music Machine Mondays Theme Song" (2017)
- "Emerson" (2017)
- "Music Box, Harp & Hammered Dulcimer" (2018)
- "Moon and Star" (2018)
- "Sandviken Stradivarius" (2018)
- "Local Cluster" (2018)
- "Olivier" (2018)
- "Proof of Concept" (2019)
