= Hemvägen =

EP by Detektivbyrån
- Released: 14 September 2006
- Genre: Pop
- Length: 23:55
- Label: Danarkia

Detektivbyrån chronology
Hemvägen (2006)	Detektivbyrån - Hemstad (2007)

Hemvägen is the first release by Detektivbyrån released on the band's own label Danarkia. The band made the songs "E18", "Nattöppet" and "Dansbanan" available on their website. Nattöppet was used in a holiday-themed Sprint commercial in 2007.

== Track listing ==
1. "E18" - 3:29
2. "Hemvägen" - 4:03
3. "Nattöppet" - 3:20
4. "Monster" - 2:49
5. "Dansbanan" - 3:49
6. "Granmon" - 2:19
7. "Vänerhavet" - 4:06
