= Paulus Moreelse =

Dutch portrait painter (1571–1638)

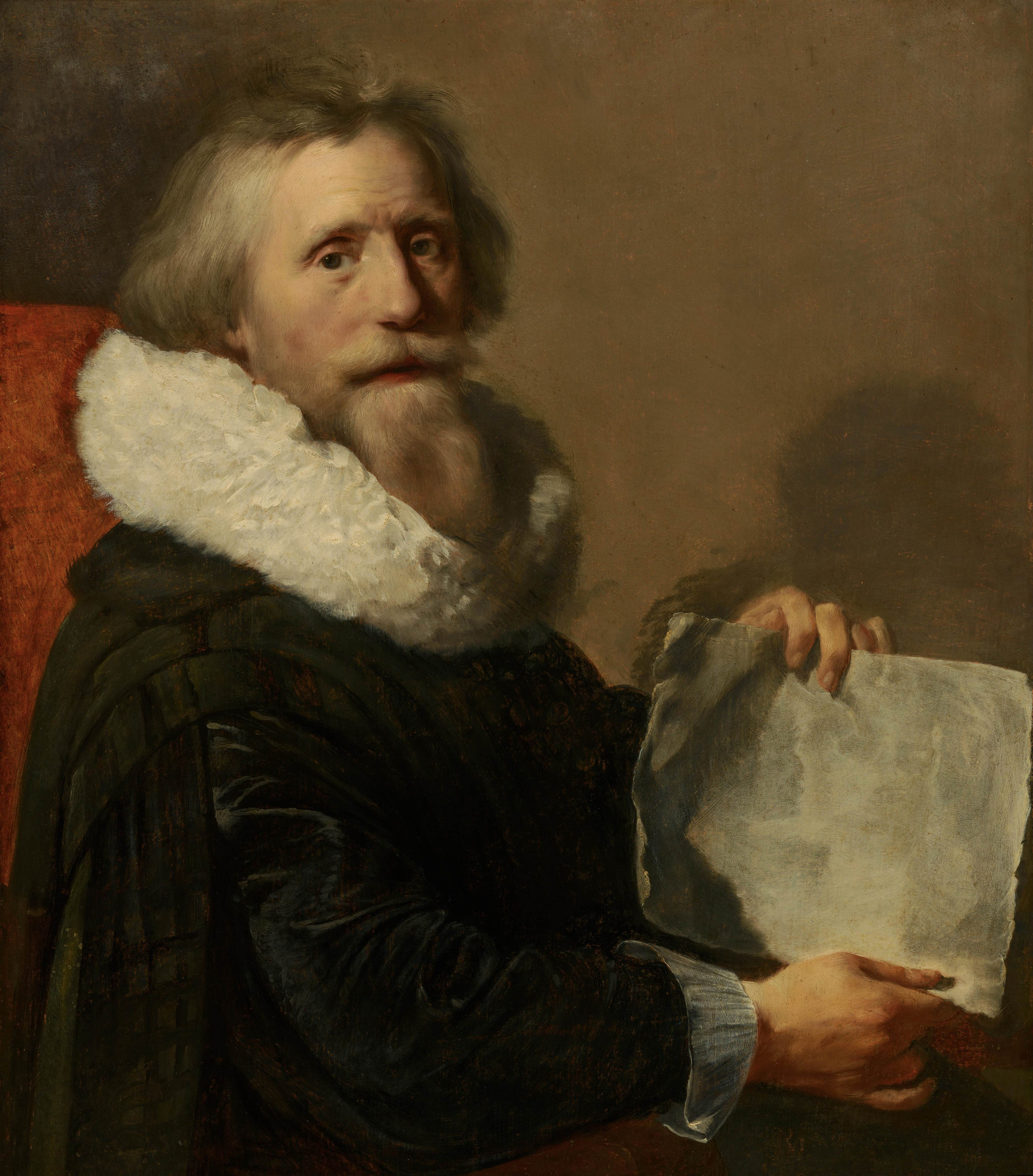
Self-portrait, c. 1630 (Mauritshuis, The Hague).

Paulus Moreelse (1571 – 6 March 1638) was a Dutch painter, mainly of portraits.

== Life ==
Moreelse was born and lived most of his life in Utrecht. He was a pupil of the Delft portrait painter Michiel Jansz. van Mierevelt, who had himself been a pupil of Anthonie van Blocklandt. He took a study-trip to Italy, where he received many portrait commissions. Back in Utrecht, in 1596 he became a member of the zadelaarsgilde (Saddler's guild), which then embraced the painters as well. In 1611, along with Abraham Bloemaert, he was one of the founders of a new painters' guild, called "St. Lucas-gilde", and became its first deken.

Moreelse was a well known portrait painter who received commissions from right across the Dutch Republic. His earliest known work dates to 1606. Other than portraits, he also painted a few history paintings in the Mannerist style and in the 1620s produced pastoral scenes of herders and shepherds. He belonged to the same generation as Abraham Bloemaert and Joachim Wtewael, and like Wtewael he played an important role in the public life of their city. His version of Diana and Callisto was engraved by Jan Saenredam. In 1618, when the anti-remonstrants came to power in Utrecht, he was expelled from the council (raadslid).

Moreelse was also active as an architect, building Utrecht's Catharijnepoort (1626, demolished c.1850) and possibly also the Vleeshuis (still extant) on Voorstraat from 1637. He taught at Utrecht's tekenacademie, and among his many pupils was Dirck van Baburen. On his death, he was buried in the Buurkerk in Utrecht.

== Public collections ==
Among the public collections holding works by Paulus Moreelse are:

- Museum de Fundatie, Zwolle, The Netherlands
- Rijksmuseum, Amsterdam

== Works ==
Paulus Moreelse

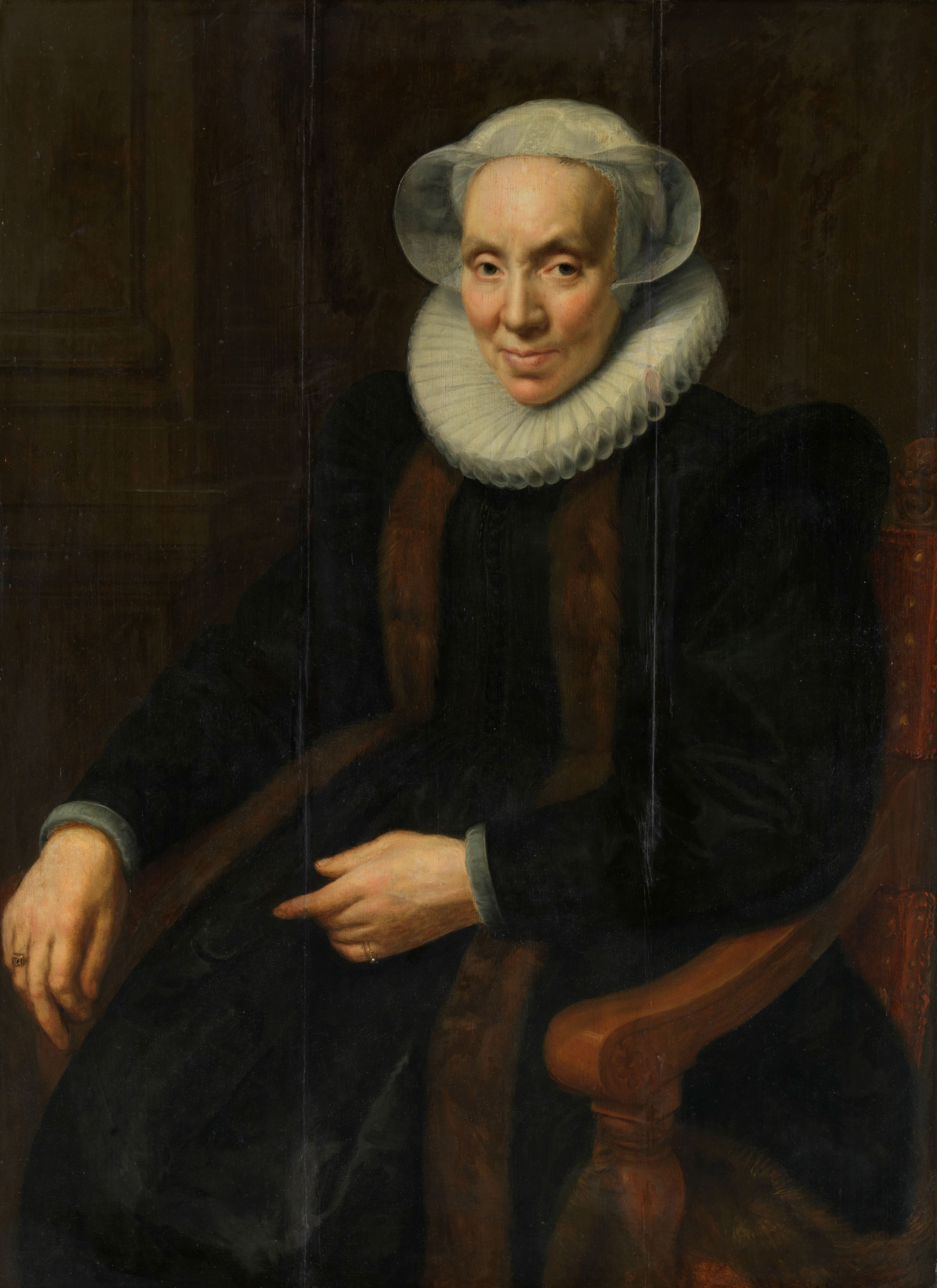
Portrait of Maria van Utrecht, 1615
(Rijksmuseum, Amsterdam).

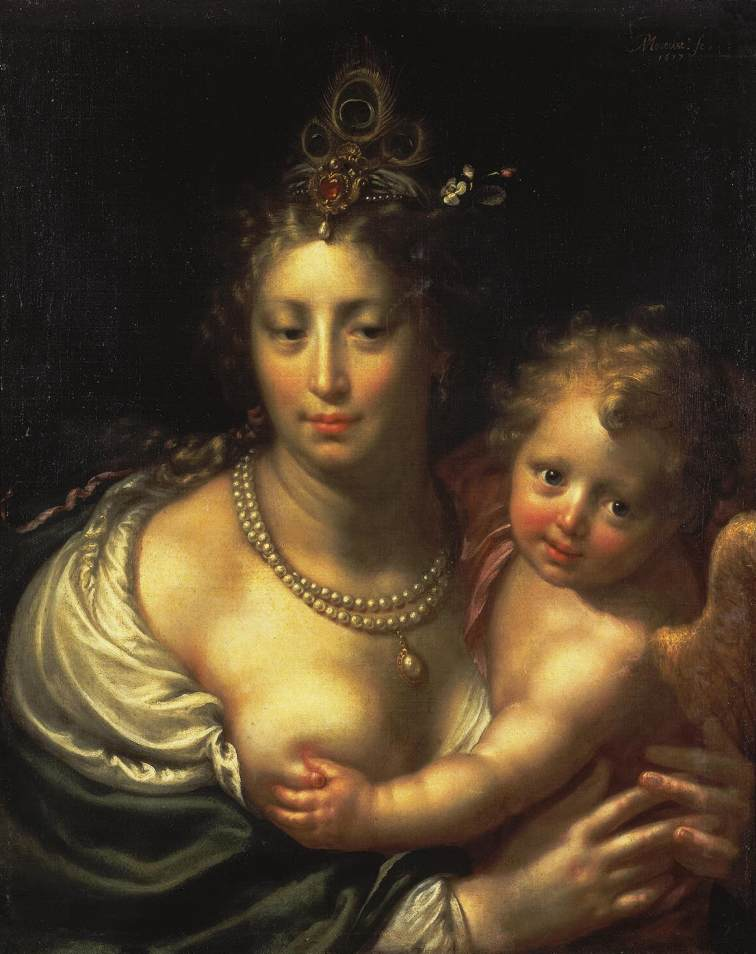
Venus and Cupid, 1617 (Hermitage, St Petersburg).

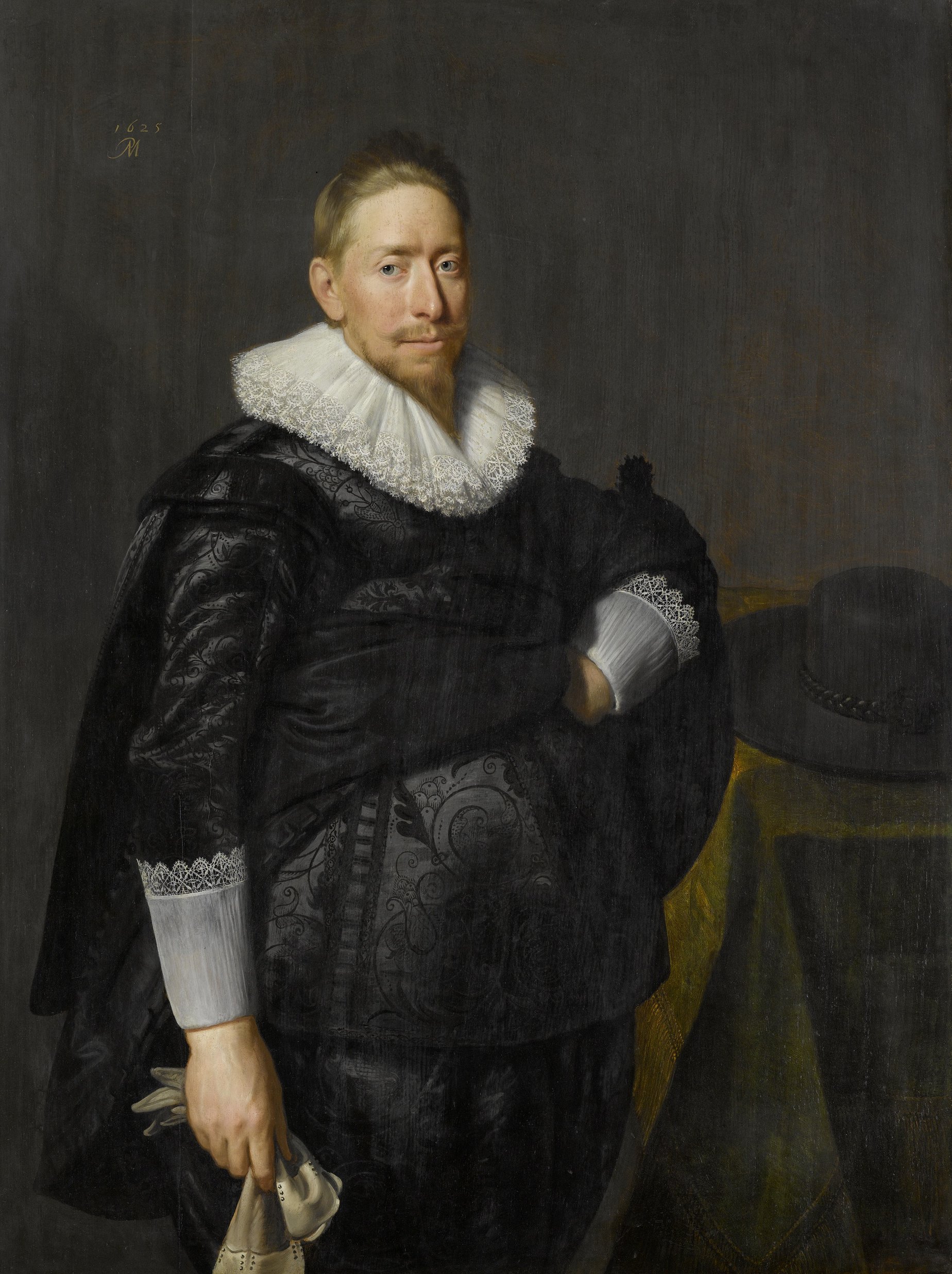
Portrait of a man, 1625 (Rijksmuseum, Amsterdam).

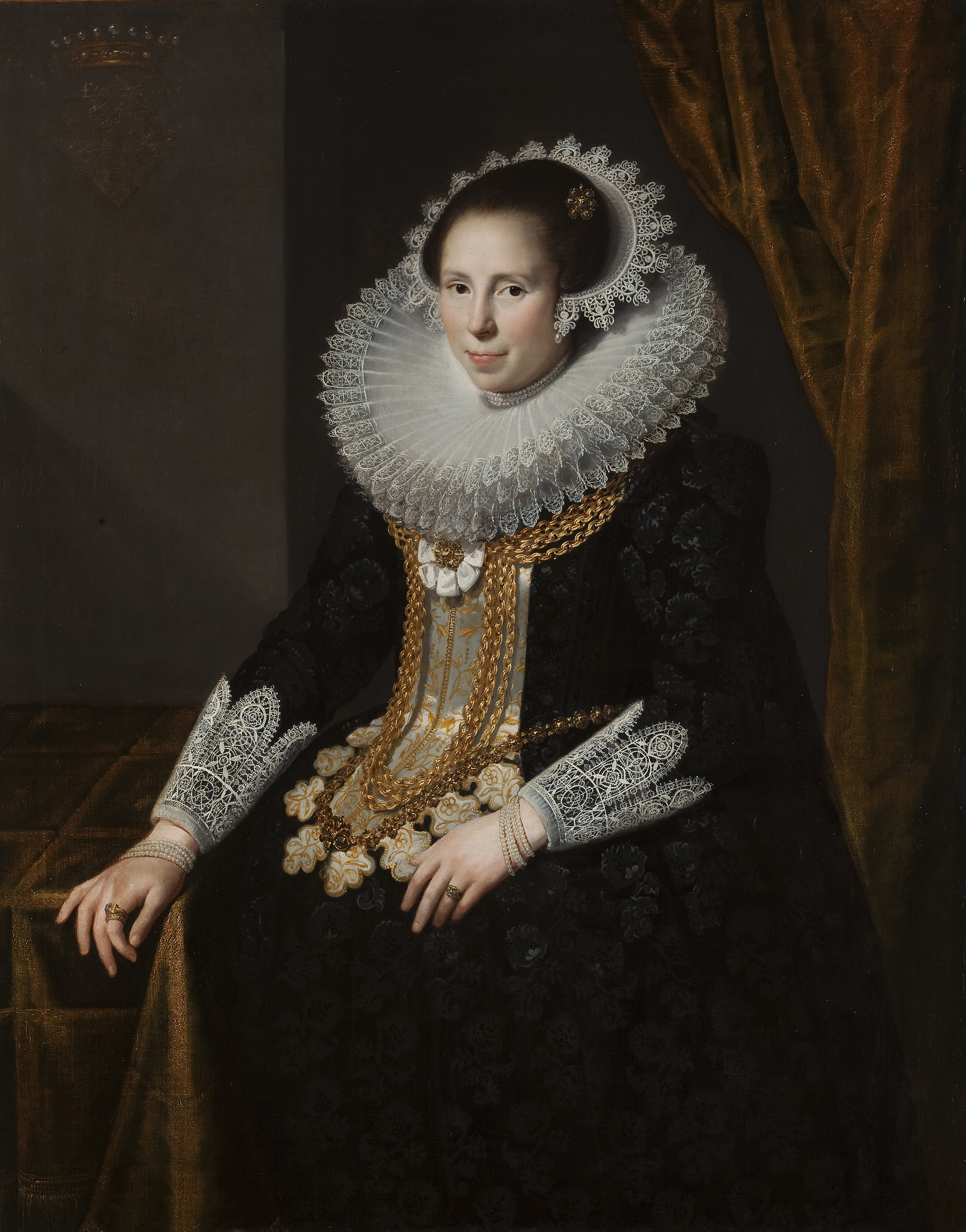
Johanna Martens, 1625
(Prado, Madrid).

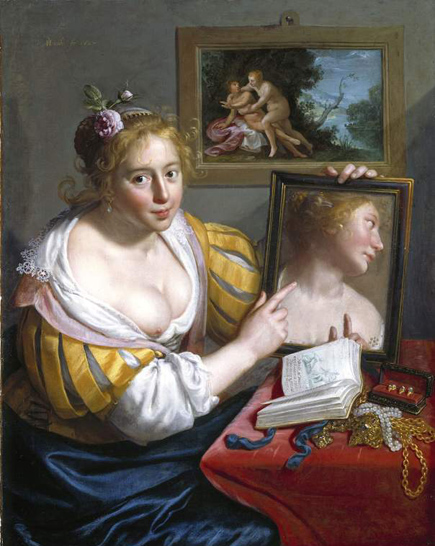
Girl with a Mirror - Allegory of Profane Love, 1627
(Fitzwilliam Museum, Cambridge).

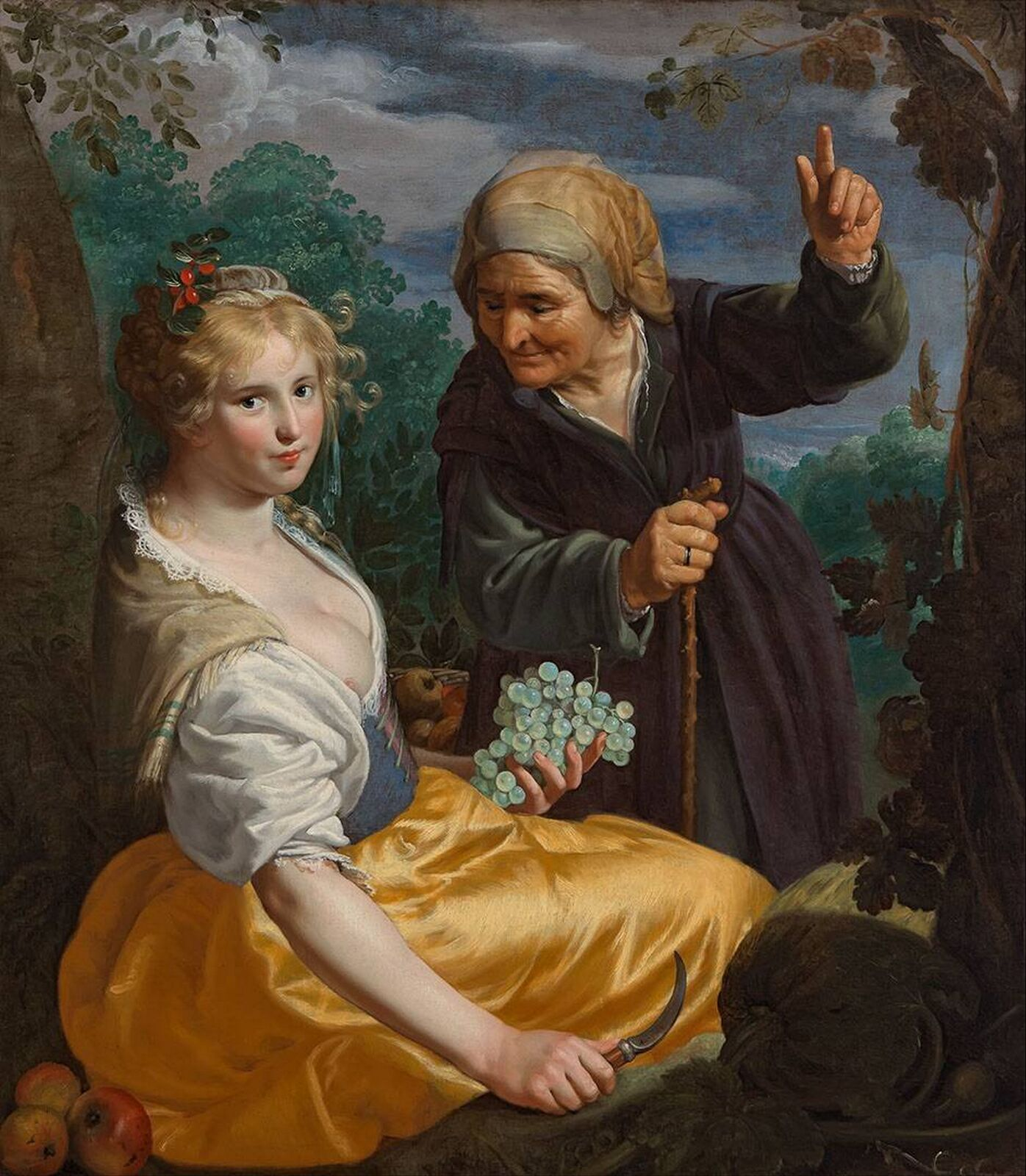
Vertumnus and Pomona, 1630 (Museum Boijmans Van Beuningen, Rotterdam).

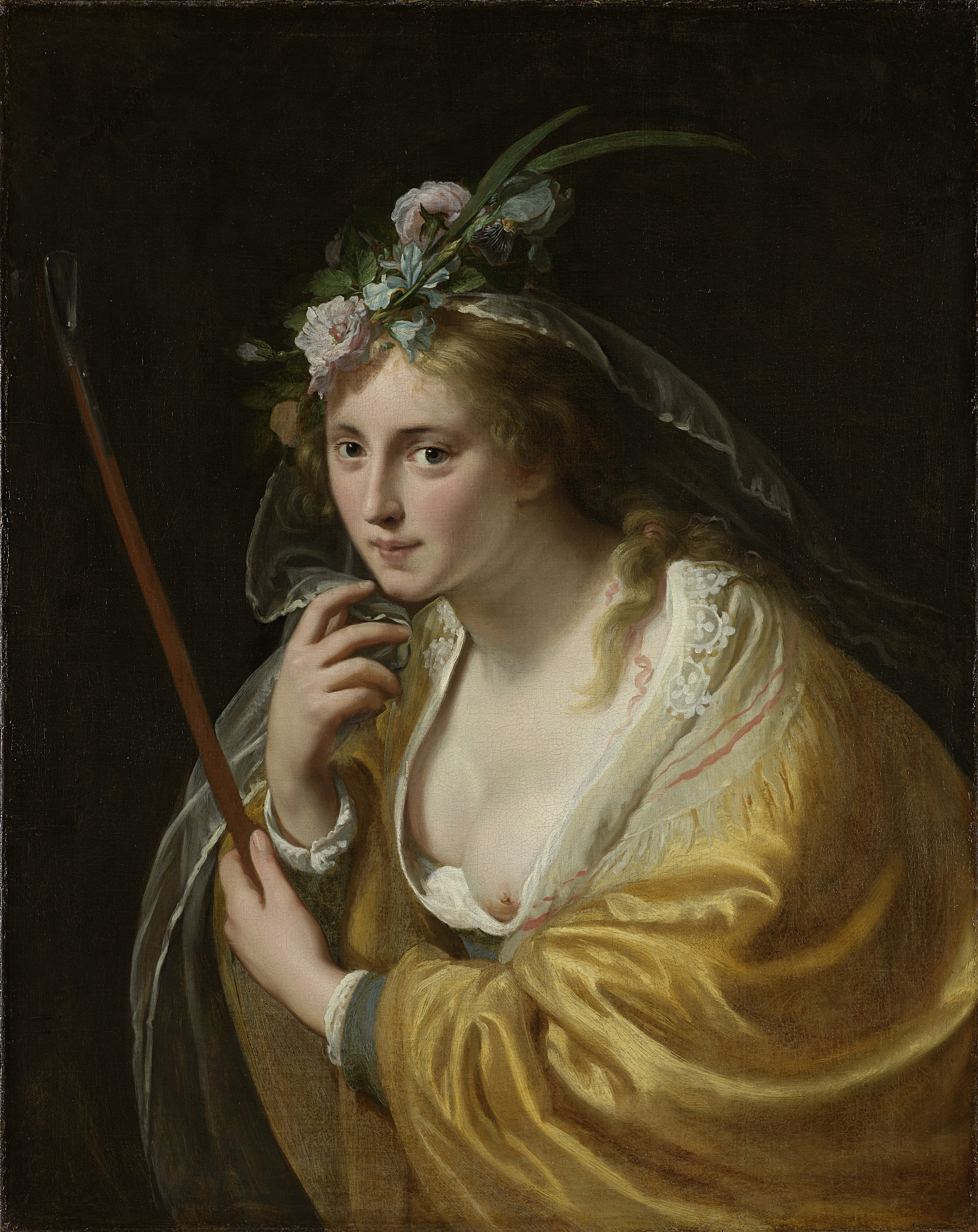
A Shepherdess, 1630 (Rijksmuseum, Amsterdam).

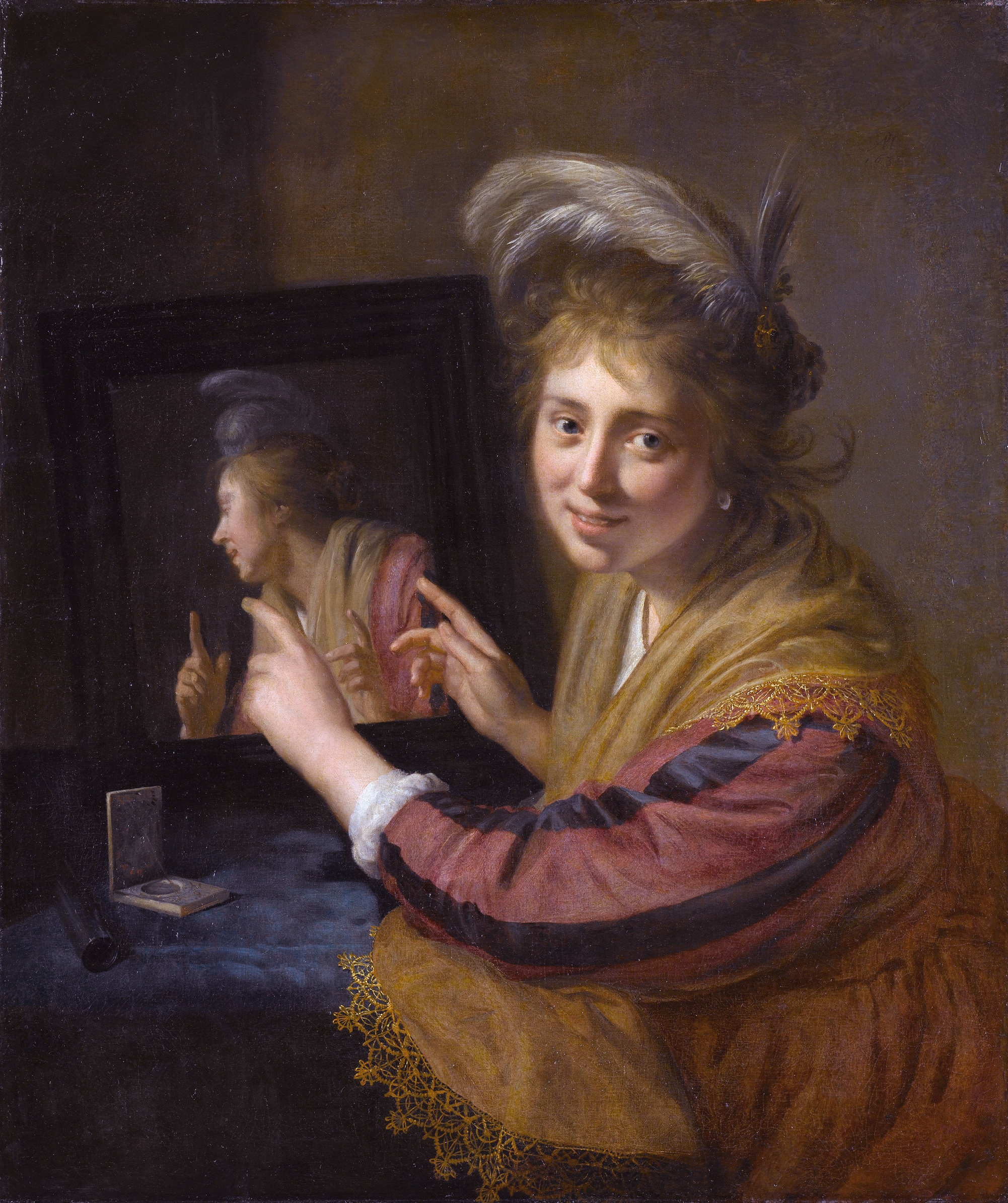
Girl at a mirror, 1632 (Rijksmuseum, Amsterdam).

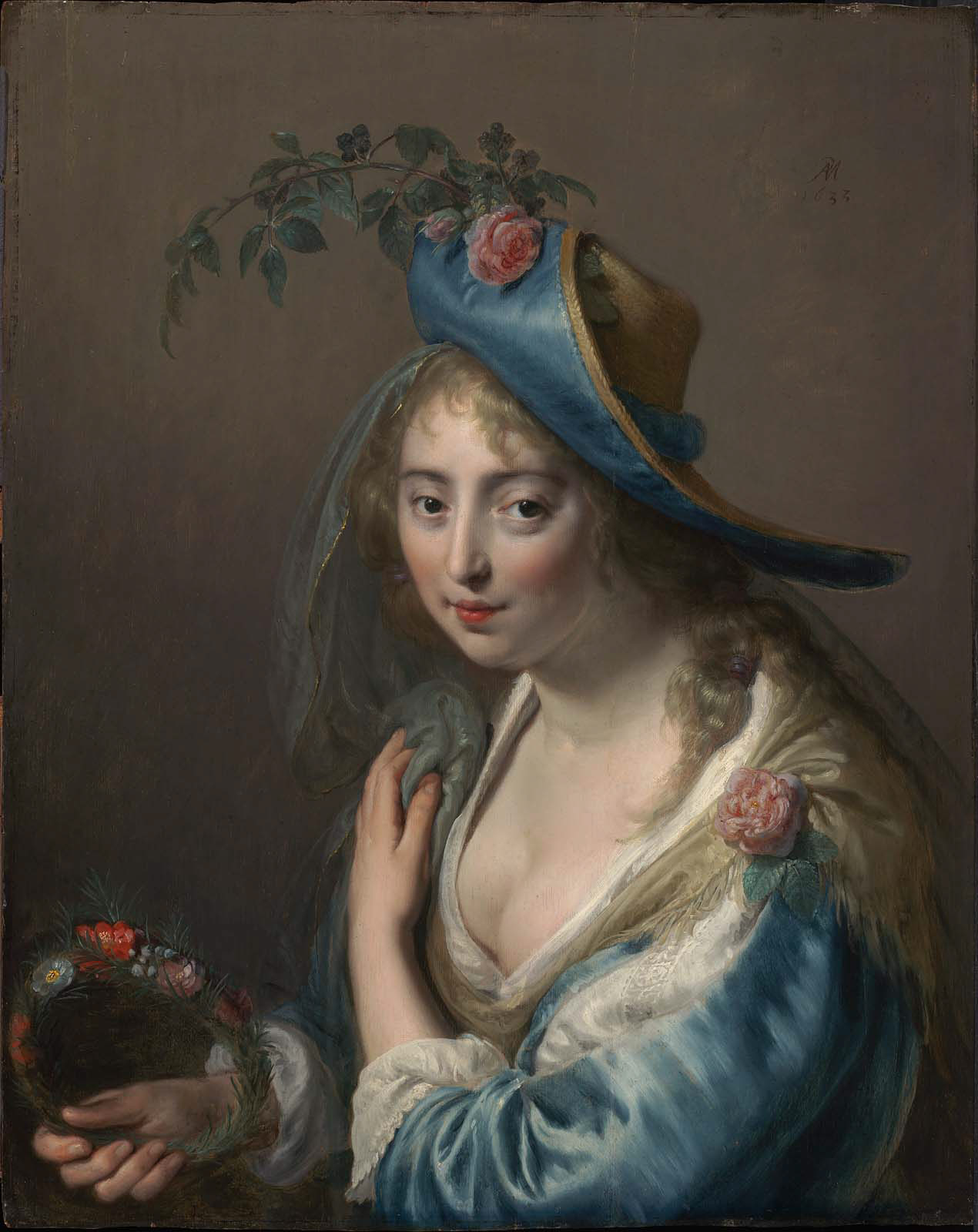
Mythological portrait, 1633 (Museum of Fine Arts, Boston)

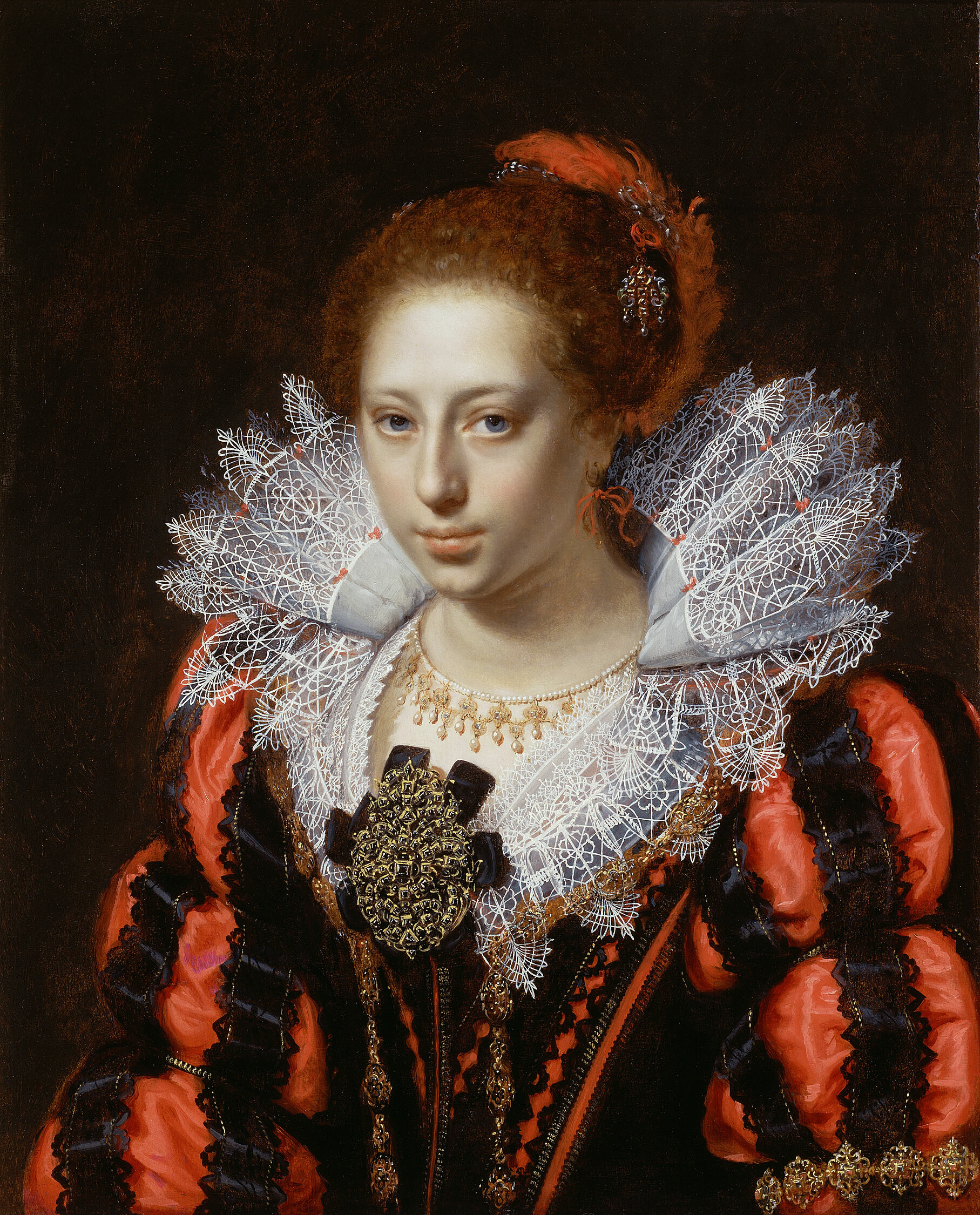
Portrait of a Young Lady, 1620 (Art Institute of Chicago)

== See also ==
- Johannes Moreelse
