= Abraham van Cuylenborch =

Dutch painter

- Born: 1620; Utrecht
- Died: 22 November 1658 (aged 37–38); Utrecht

Abraham van Cuylenborch or Cuylenberg; Cuylenburgh (1620 – 1658) was a Dutch Golden Age landscape painter.

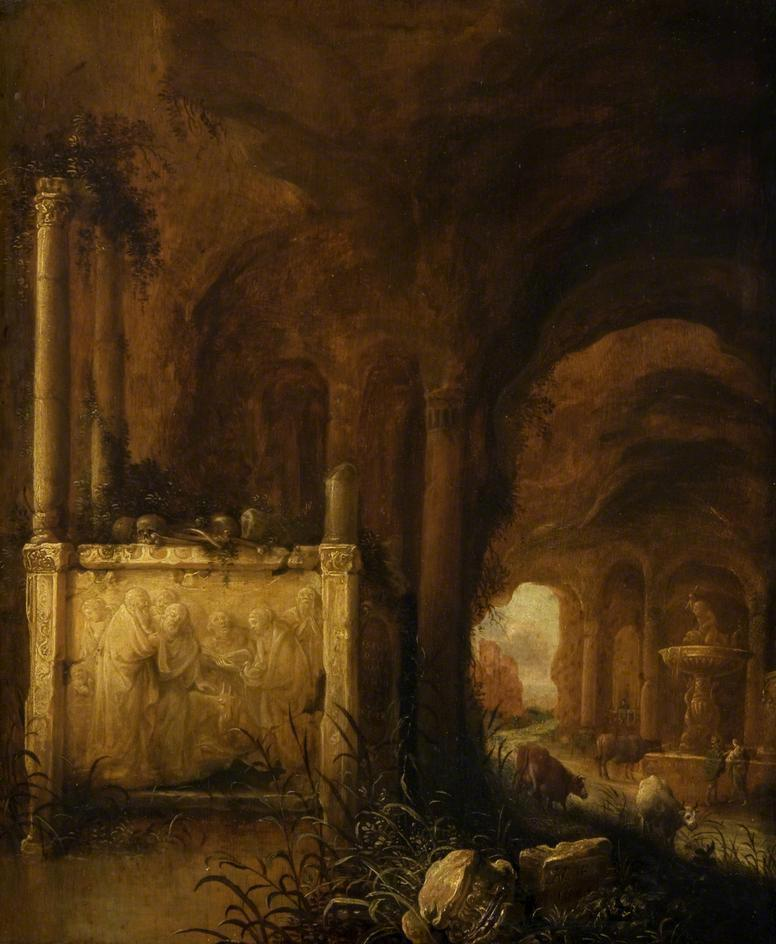
A Tomb in a Grotto, 1641

Cuylenborch was born in Utrecht and is known for landscapes with grottoes, in the manner of Cornelis van Poelenburgh.

Cuylenborch died in Utrecht.

== Works ==
- A tomb in a Grotto, oil on panel, 41 x 33.6 cm, 1641, Glasgow Museums
- Landscape with Bacchus and the nymphs, oil on panel, 58 x 72 cm, c. 1645, Metropolitan Museum of Art
- Grotto with figures, oil on panel, 32.6 x 40.3 cm, 1645–1650, Fitzwilliam Museum
- Diana bathing, oil on panel, 59 x 70 cm, 1646, Galleria Borghese
