= Animoog =

Musical mobile app

- Screenshot of Animoog 2.4.7 on iPad
- Developer: Moog Music
- Initial release: 31 October 2011
- Stable release: 2.4.19 / 3 November 2021; 4 years ago
- Operating system: iOS, BlackBerry Z10
- Size: 18.5MB
- Type: Synthesizer

Animoog
- Manufacturer: Moog Music
- Dates: 2011-Present
- Price: $29.99

Technical specifications
- Polyphony: 4
- Timbrality: 8
- LFO: 1
- Synthesis type: Digital anisotropic
- Filter: 1 selectable high-pass, band-pass, low-pass
- Attenuator: ADSR
- Aftertouch expression: yes
- Velocity expression: yes
- Effects: none

Input/output
- Keyboard: 18 keys
- External control: MIDI

Animoog is a music synth mobile app designed for iPad, iPhone and BlackBerry Z10. Animoog is powered by Moog Music's Anisotropic Synthesis Engine.

== Description ==
There are three versions of Animoog. Animoog for the iPad is simply named 'Animoog'. 'Animoog for iPhone', which offers different features and layout, works on iPhones and the iPod Touch. There also is a third version named 'Animoog for Blackberry', built for the BlackBerry Z10.

Animoog comes with tens of varied sound presets. Over 3,100 Animoog presets and 5,100 timbres are also available through official and user-provided expansion packs. Expansion packs include work from acclaimed sound designers, such as Richard Devine, Drew Neumann, Sascha Dikiciyan and Adam Holzman. A set of 82 official presets, available as in-app purchase, are derived from a 1968 live recording of the Grateful Dead's Anthem of the Sun album.

Animoog won a TEC award in early 2013 with the mention of being "Expressive, Captivating and Sonically Immersive".

Animoog is also the sound engine at the core of the Theremini, a modern theremin built by Moog.

== See also ==
- Moog synthesizer
- Moogfest's Animoog Playground
