= Museum Speelklok =

Museum in Utrecht, Netherlands

Coordinates: 52°05′26″N 5°07′09″E

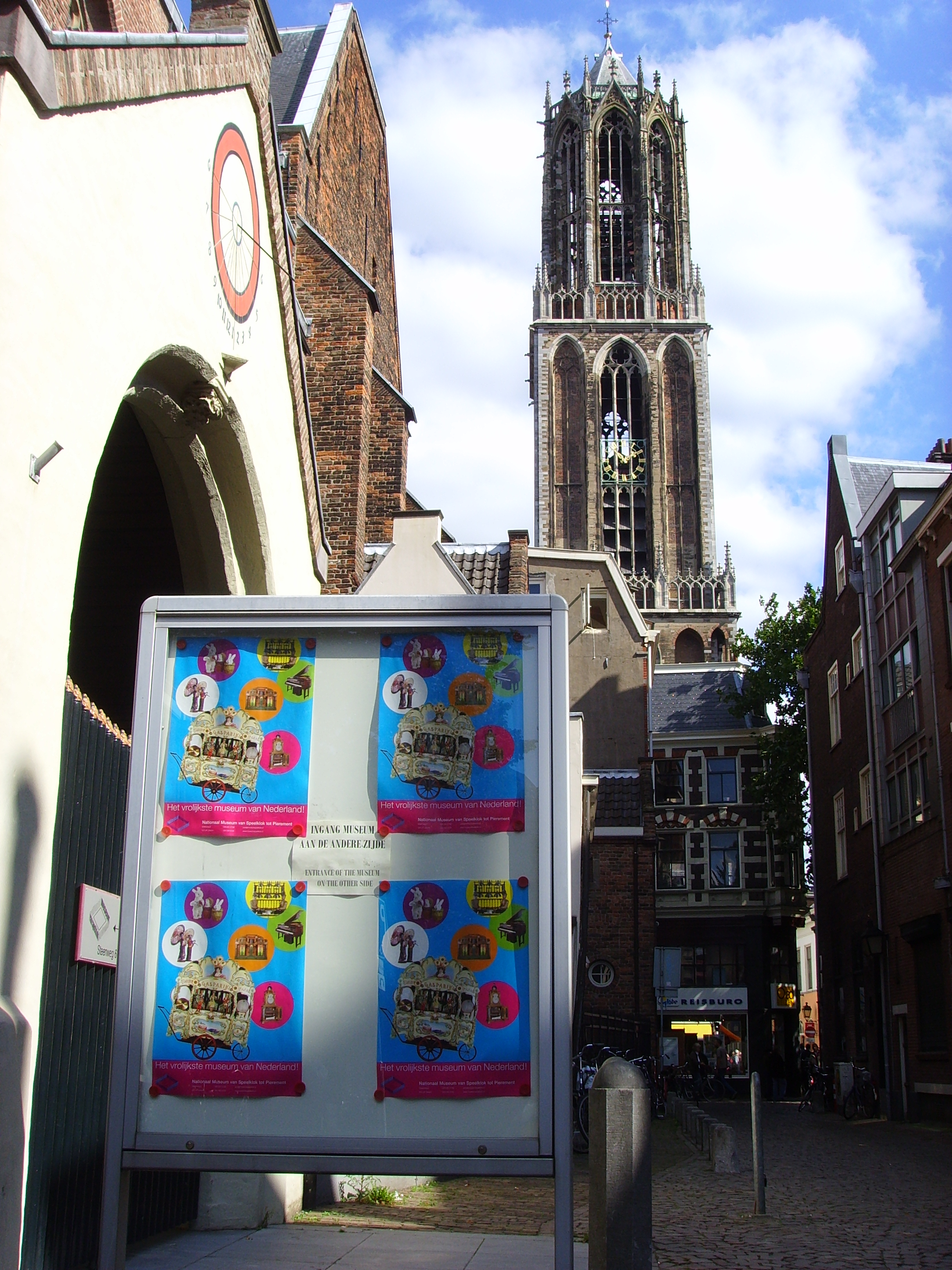
- Buurkerk en Dom
- Established: 1956
- Location: Utrecht, Netherlands
- Type: Musical
- Website: www.museumspeelklok.nl

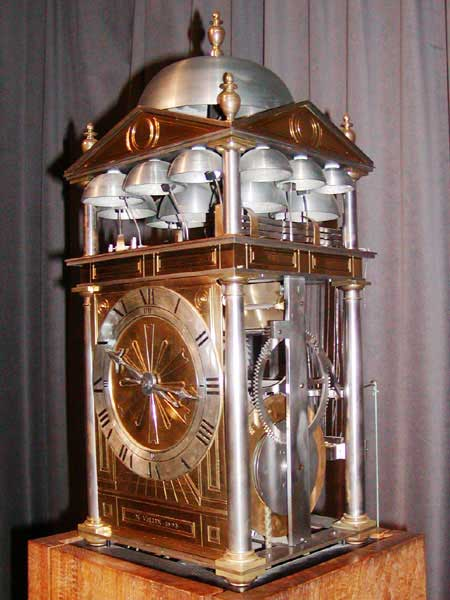
Replica of a 1598 musical clock by Nicholas Vallin, that plays its music on 13 bells

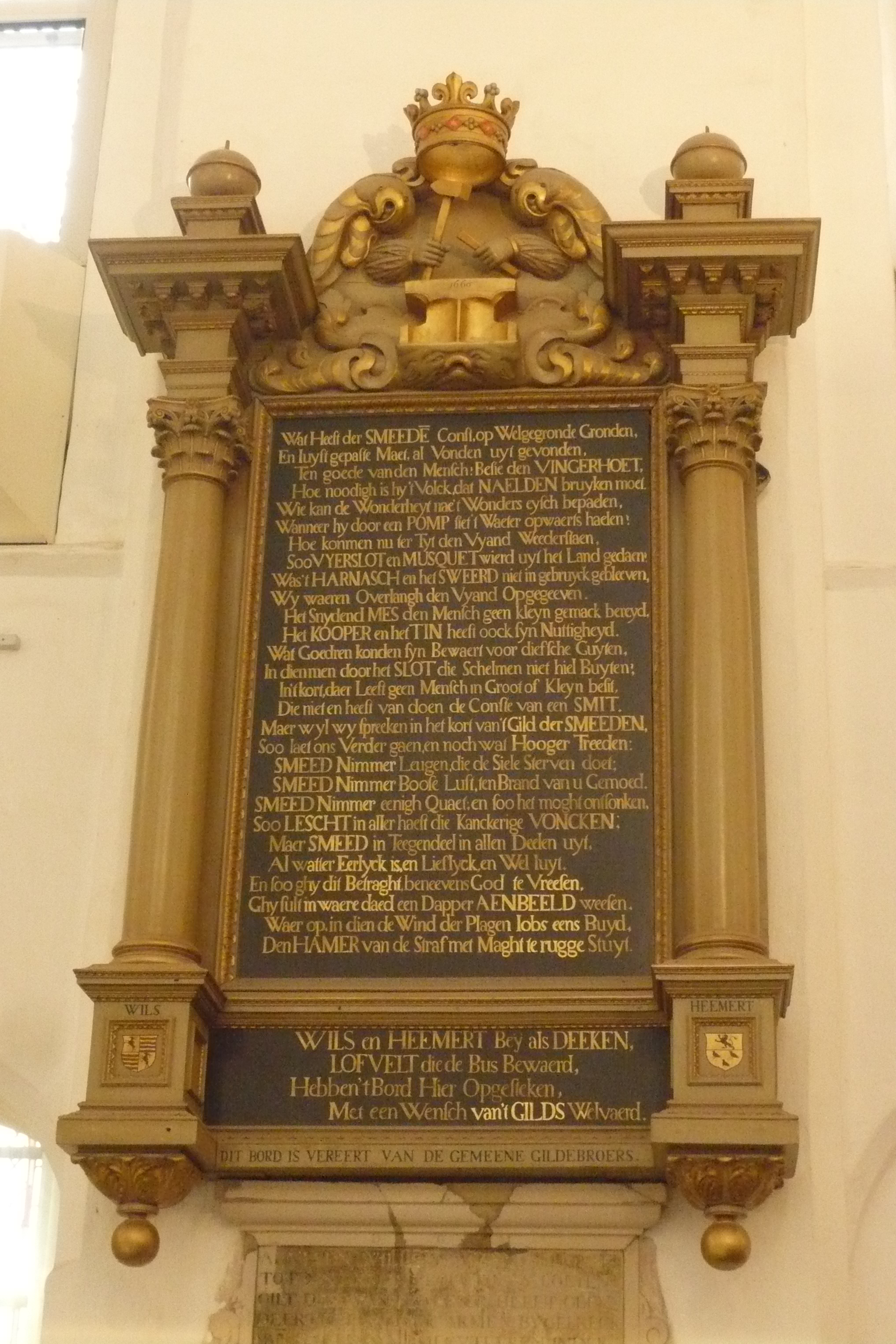
Plaque in memory of the Smith's guild in the Buurkerk (near the museum reception desk)

Museum Speelklok (previously known as Museum van Speelklok tot Pierement) is a museum in Utrecht, Netherlands, specializing in self-playing musical instruments. Since 1984, it has been housed in the centre of Utrecht in a former church called Buurkerk. Among the instruments on display are music boxes, musical clocks, pianolas, barrel organs (including the typically Dutch large street organs) and a turret clock with a carillon, most of which are still able to play for visitors. The word speelklok means musical clock.

Over the years the museum has become popular nationwide and also internationally. The museum's restoration workshops are a leader in their field, and are known for their excellent standards.

== History of the museum ==
The museum had its origins in an exhibition of mechanical organs and other musical automata in Utrecht in the summer of 1956. The great success of this led to the creation of a permanent national museum dedicated to mechanical musical instruments. Since 1984 the museum has been housed in the central medieval Buurkerk (citizens' church) and was officially opened by Queen Beatrix.

For its 50-year jubilee in 2006, the museum held a special exhibition, "Royal Music Machines". For this event, various renowned museums, including the Hermitage Museum, the Louvre, the Metropolitan Museum of Art in New York, and the Kunsthistorisches Museum in Vienna, loaned very special instruments.

== Influence and coverage in media ==
In 2016, Swedish musician Martin Molin visited Museum Speelklok and stated that the experience inspired him to build Marble Machine, an instrument constructed with plywood that plays music through the use of falling metal marbles. Molin's retired Marble Machine was transported to Museum Speelklok as a temporary attraction in Summer 2017. In August 2017, Molin announced a weekly video series on streaming site YouTube that showcased various instruments from the museum in a series known as 'Music Machine Mondays'.

== See also ==
- List of music museums
