= Theremini =

Monophonic digital synthesizer

- Manufacturer: Moog Music
- Price: £249 $319.00

Technical specifications
- Timbrality: 1
- LFO: 2
- Attenuator: ADSR
- Aftertouch expression: yes
- Velocity expression: yes
- Storage memory: 32 patches
- Effects: Stereo Ping-Pong Delay

Input/output
- Keyboard: 37 keys
- External control: MIDI, CV/Gate Two 1/4" audio outputs

The Theremini is a monophonic digital synthesizer manufactured by Moog Music and is a re-working on one of the oldest electronic instruments in history, the Theremin, created by Léon Theremin in 1929 and made popular as a source of atmospheric sound tracks for science fiction films. Similar to the Theremin, the Theremini does not require physical contact to play it. Rather, the device gauges the proximity of the performer's hands to determine the parameters of a performed note. The left hand controls the amplitude (volume), and the right hand controls the frequency (pitch). Unlike the original Theremin, this unit is designed to be easier to play, as it also features pitch correction. The instrument was announced at the NAMM Show in 2014.

== Physical features ==
The mast-like pitch antenna is removable and can be securely clipped into a recessed space on the underside of the device, while the amplitude antenna is incorporated into the case design and can double as a carrying handle. A 3/8” threaded socket is provided on the base so that it can be mounted on a mic stand or tripod for interference-free playing, although the instrument can also be played on a table top.

== Audio output ==
The unit features a built in speaker, although quarter inch jacks are also included to connect to a loudspeaker or amplifier.

== Patches ==
The unit features pre programmed 32 patches (wave or wavetable-based patches).

== Control interfaces ==
The Theremini has a single scalable CV (control voltage) output from either the pitch antenna or the amplitude antenna, enabling it to control many modular analogue synthesisers. As with most other Moog equipment a 0.25” mono jack socket is used. The device also has a single USB-based MIDI output port with two assignable control channels, one for each antenna.

== Software editor ==
Moog Theremini Software Editor is available for iOS, Mac and PC.
