= Detektivbyrån =

Swedish folktronica trio (2005 - 2010)

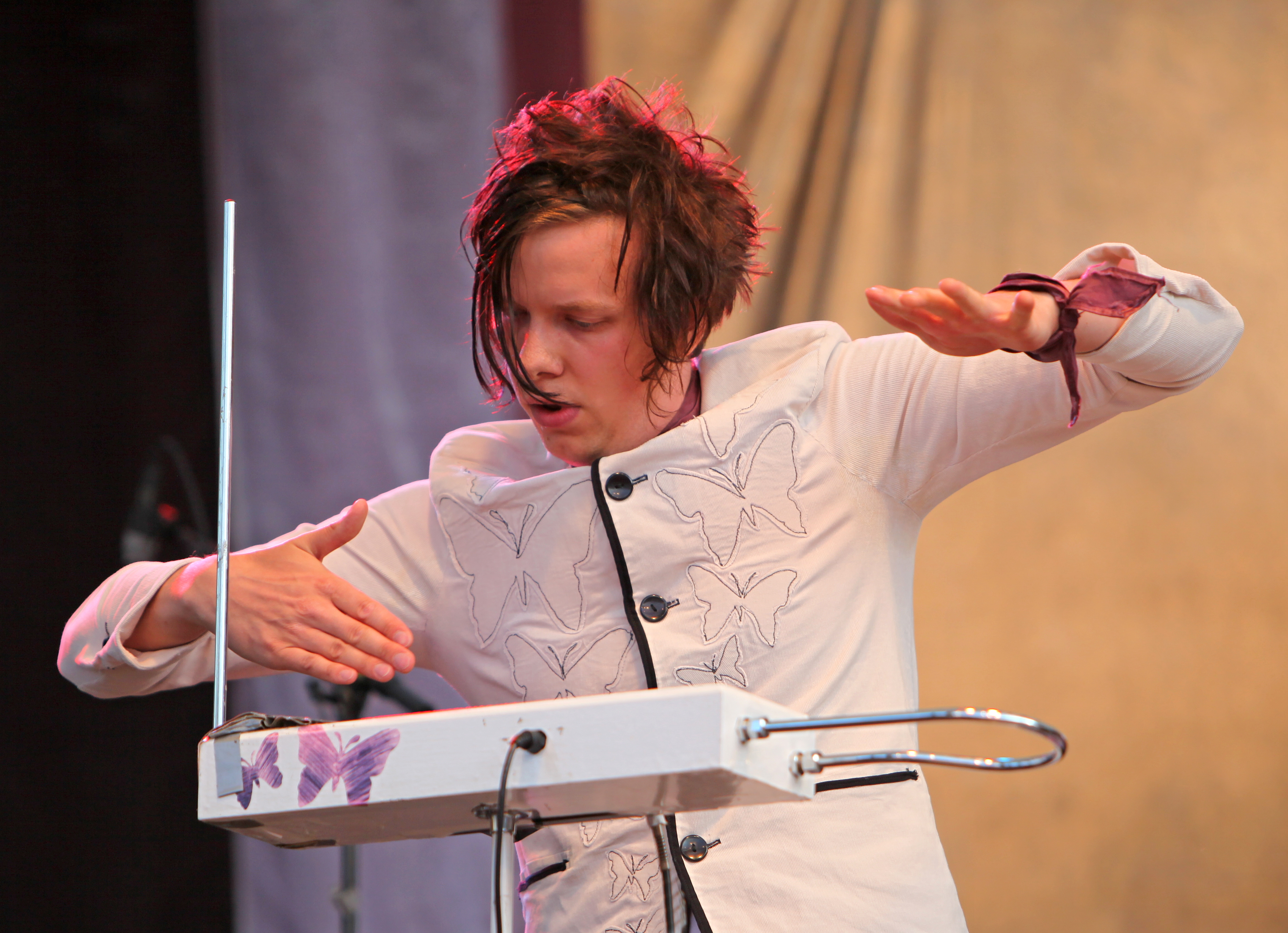
- Swedish music group Detektivbyrån during Stockholm Pride 2009.

Background information
- Origin: Karlstad, Sweden
- Genres: Electronica, Folk music, Folktronica
- Years active: 2005 - 2010
- Labels: Danarkia
- Past members: Anders "Flanders" Molin; Martin Molin; Jon Nils Emanuel Ekström (2005-2009); Marcus Sjöberg (2009-2010)
- Website: www.detektivbyran.net

Detektivbyrån ("The Detective Agency") was a Swedish electronica and folk music trio from Karlstad. The group consisted of Anders "Flanders" Molin (accordion, music box), Martin "MacGyver" Molin (glockenspiel, traktofon, Toy piano, Theremin), Jon Nils Emanuel Ekström (drums, sound box, small bells), and later on, Marcus Sjöberg (drums).

The three members grew up in the city of Karlstad, Sweden, located in Värmland County, but they did not form a band until they had moved to Gothenburg in 2005. The usage of more unusual instruments such as the accordion was inspired both by its prominent use in the soundtrack for Amélie as well as musical traditions in Värmland. As the band also played as street musicians there was originally also a requirement to have portable instruments such as the glockenspiel.

Between 2006 and 2008 the band toured extensively and also participated in several Swedish radio and TV shows including a program at MTV Europe.

On 3 September 2008 Detektivbyrån released their first full-length album, Wermland. The band was nominated for two Grammis awards, as newcomer of the year and folk music of the year in 2009. In addition they were also nominated for an award at Manifestgalan as the best live act of 2008.

In February 2009, Jon Nils Emanuel Ekström left the band, Marcus Sjöberg took his place, leaving the band still working on the future album tentatively named "Beyond". Ekström had previously been playing drums, sound box, small bells on the band's albums and concerts. The band had also recently been contributing to the soundtrack of the American film Tenure.

In August 2010, the band was dissolved and clearly stated on their official website that they would not make any more music or live performances under the name Detektivbyrån.

In September 2012, Martin announced that he was producing a new album. His new band Wintergatan released their first album in 2013. The new band includes Marcus Sjöberg as well.

== Discography ==
=== Albums ===
- E18 (2008)
- Wermland (2008)

=== EPs ===
- Hemvägen (2006)

=== Singles ===
- Detektivbyrån - Hemstad (Split 7" vinyl) (2007)
- Lyckans Undulat (2007)
