= Martin Molin =

Swedish composer, musician and engineer

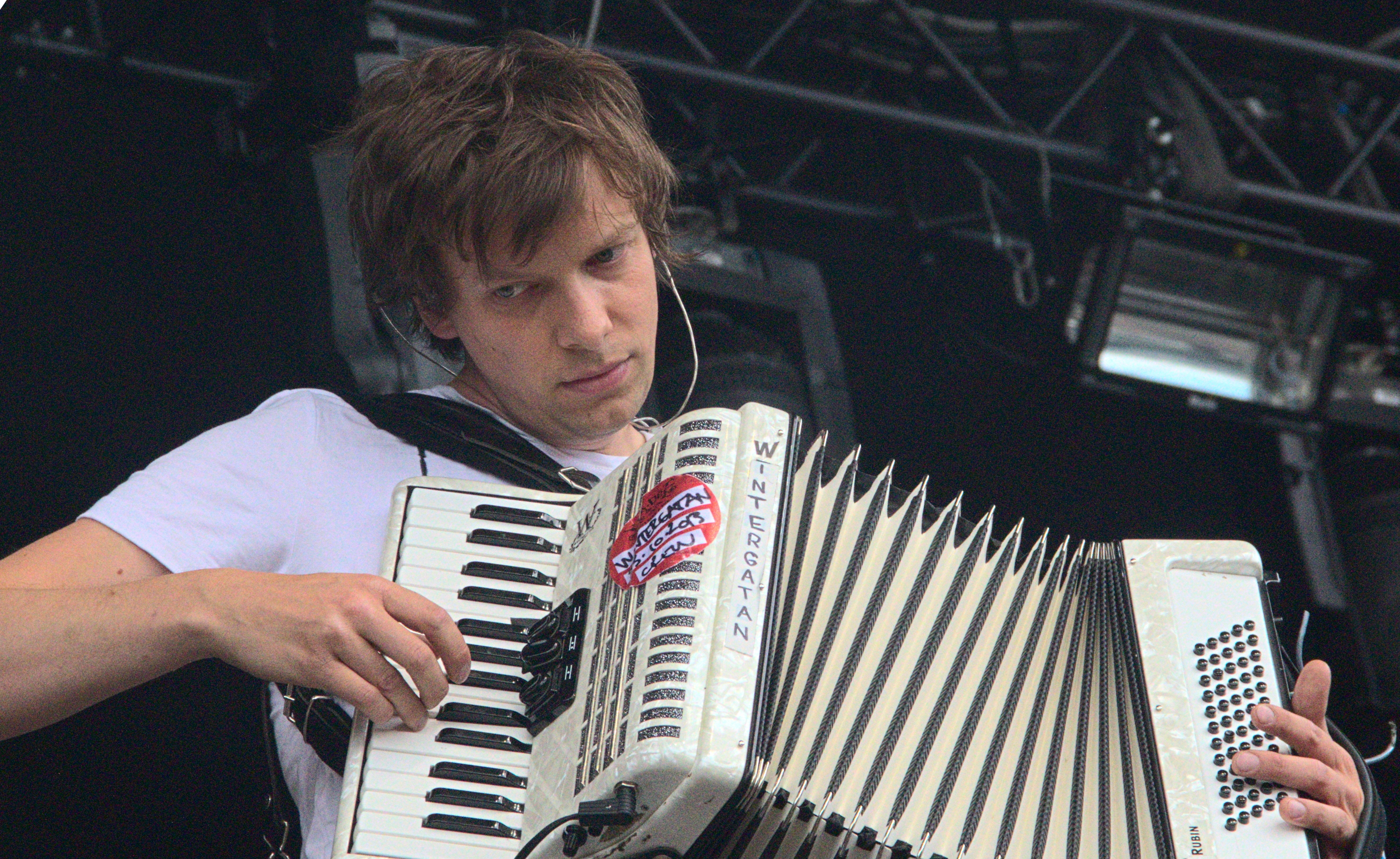
- Molin at Haldern Pop 2016
- Born: Martin Molin; 24 January 1983 (age 43)
- Occupation: Musician

YouTube information
- Channel: Wintergatan
- Years active: 2013–present
- Subscribers: 2.78 million
- Views: 573.6 million
- Musical career
- Genres: Folktronica
- Instruments: Keyboards; vibraphone; accordion; theremin; guitar; bass; music box; electronics
- Last updated: 15 March 2026
- Website: wintergatan.net

Martin Molin (Swedish pronunciation: [mo'li:n], morr-LEEN; born January 24, 1983) is a Swedish composer, producer, multi-instrumentalist, inventor and constructor. He is a member of the folktronica and post-rock band Wintergatan, and previously a member of Detektivbyrån. He grew up at Kronoparken in Karlstad, Sweden. From 2017 he lived and worked in southern France, where he built a custom music studio and workshop, but in April 2022 he moved back to Sweden.

== Education and early career ==
Molin studied music at the Musikmakarna (Songwriters Academy) in Örnsköldsvik. In 2005, he and his brother Anders Molin were inspired to start Detektivbyrån, after he heard La Valse d'Amélie by Yann Tiersen. The group disbanded in 2010.

== Wintergatan ==
In 2011 Molin, Evelina Hägglund, Marcus Sjöberg and David Zandén created the band Wintergatan. The group gained attention when, inspired by a visit to the Speelklok Museum, Molin built his "Marble Machine", a music box made of 3000 components that played using 2000 metal marbles. After working on the machine for over 14 months, he released a music video featuring the Marble Machine in 2016, which as of September 2025 has over 270 million views on YouTube. He then started work on the "Marble Machine X", or "MMX", a more robust redesign of the machine with the aim of recording an album with it and taking it on a world tour.

Molin documented the construction process of the "MMX" on the band's YouTube channel. This at one point was called "Wintergatan Wednesdays" but lost the title when Molin experimented with new formats and release schedules. In January 2021, Molin started a new YouTube channel called "Wintergatan 2" with videos in the style of daily vlogs (as opposed to the intermittent videos on "Wintergatan") documenting the ongoing Marble Machine X build project in greater detail. A month later, Molin largely rolled the "Wintergatan 2" content back into the main Wintergatan channel.

In 2017, he presented a series Music Machine Mondays about the exhibits in the Dutch Speelklok Museum. In 2020 he planned to present a similar series about the collection of Siegfrieds Mechanisches Musikkabinett (Siegfried's Mechanical Music Cabinet) in Germany. This was, however, halted due to the COVID-19 pandemic. As of May 2021, the series still has not recommenced.

Molin eventually abandoned the MMX project, and on March 2, 2022, started a new designing process of a new Marble Machine 3, livestreaming whole CAD process on his Youtube channel.

In April 23, 2022, he announced that he is moving back from Lorgues (France) to Sweden for personal reasons.
