= Music of Vienna =

Vienna is the capital and largest city of Austria, and has long been one of the major centers for cultural development in central Europe.

Music organizations in Vienna include the Gesellschaft der Musikfreunde, which has been promoting musical development in the city since 1812. The Vienna Boys Choir has an even longer history, dating back to 1498, while the Vienna Philharmonic Orchestra is also renowned .

Major music venues in Vienna include the State Opera House, the People's Opera House, the Burgtheater, and the Theater an der Wien, the former three of which are owned by the federal government .

== Viennese classicism ==
The city was home to many great composers of the classical music era, during the late 18th and early 19th century, such as Joseph Haydn, Wolfgang Amadeus Mozart, Ludwig van Beethoven and Franz Schubert; this was called Viennese classicism .

== Schrammelmusik ==
The most popular form of modern Austrian folk music is Viennese schrammelmusik, which is played with an accordion and a double-necked guitar. Modern performers include Roland Neuwirth, Karl Hodina and Edi Reiser.

Schrammelmusik arose as a mixture of rural Austrian, Hungarian, Slovenian, Moravian and Bavarian immigrants crowded the slums of Vienna. At the time, waltzes and ländlers mixed with the music of the immigrants absorbing sounds from all over central and eastern Europe and the Balkans. The name Schrammelmusik comes from two of the most popular and influential performers in Schrammelmusik's history, brothers Johann and Josef Schrammel. The Schrammels formed a trio called along with bass guitarist Anton Strohmayer and helped bring the music to the middle- and upper-class Viennese, as well as people from surrounding areas. With the addition of a clarinetist, George Dänzer, they formed the Schrammel-Quartett, and Schrammelmusik's form settled on a quartet.

Neuwirth is a younger performer who has incorporated foreign influences, most especially the blues, to some criticism from purists. He is the leader of the band Extremschrammeln.

== Wienerlied ==
The Wienerlied is a unique and very popular song genre from Vienna. There are approximately 60,000 – 70,000 Wienerlieder

== Music Festivals ==
Yearly the Waves Vienna Music Festival & Conference takes place in October. This festival is a showcase festival for European pop music acts.
