= Schrammel =

Schrammel is a surname. Notable people with the surname include:

- Johann Schrammel (1850–1893), Austrian composer and musician
- Josef Schrammel (1852–1895), Austrian composer and musician
- Roland Schrammel (born 1968), Austrian football player
- Thomas Schrammel (born 1987), Austrian football player

== See also ==
- Schrammel accordion
- Schrammel guitar
- Schrammelmusik
