= Schrammel accordion =

Musical instrument

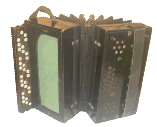
A Schrammel accordion (Die Schrammelharmonika)

A Schrammel accordion (German: Schrammelharmonika) is an accordion with a melody (right hand) keyboard in the chromatic B-Griff system and a twelve-button diatonic bass keyboard. It is named for a traditional combination of two violins, accordion or clarinet, and contraguitar known as a Schrammelquartet – a group that played Schrammelmusik in the Vienna chamber music tradition.

In most cases, the instrument has two or three sets of reeds tuned in unison configuration. Its sound is quite different from modern chromatic button accordions, because it is much smaller and lighter. The handmade reeds used may also contribute to its sound.

== History ==
The first written notice about the existence of such instruments are from the 1854 Industrial Exhibition in Munich. The Vienna accordion builder Matthäus Bauer was mentioned as one who showed instruments with piano keyboards, and one with a "3 row machine and accidentals", mentioned in combination with the piano accordion. It seems likely that it was unisonoric and chromatic. Matthäus Bauer then held a Vienna privilegium (Patent, 1851). Advertisements in newspapers of the time show pictures of various accordions, that were mostly diatonic, but also piano and 3-row B-Griff configurations.

Alfred Mirek mentions the instrument as precursor of the Bayan in his book. The first Bayan was built in 1870.

By 1890 the Vienna "Harmonika" builders produced a very large range of instrument types. In 1900 there were 72 accordion builders in Vienna. They also sold copies of English concertinas, German concertinas and bandoneons.

Some documented names of Vienna accordion builders that were building instruments over two generations are: Reisinger, Edmund Hochholzer, Josef Trimmel, Pospisil, Bauer, Pick, Adolf Regelstein, Franz Kuritka, Josef Barton, Budowitz; many more were not documented.

Some instruments at that time had up to 46 chromatic bass buttons, some had an early version left hand bass with mechanics similar to the modern Stradella Bass, or only 36 buttons with unison single notes. But the usual Schrammelharmonika had only 12 bisonoric bass buttons. This was not a limitation, because a versatile musician could combine two or more buttons and so obtain a great variety of chords including seventh and diminished.

The idea of arranging the buttons in B-Griff order goes back to a musician named Franz Walter. The oldest known and still usable instrument dates from 1874. The first instruments had fewer buttons on the treble side - 46, 49, and later 52 Buttons on three rows.

After 1954 few such instruments were produced in Vienna.

More about History on the German Wikipedia site:

- PianoAccordion
- de:Harmonika
- Harmonium

== Today ==
Most instruments still surviving date from the 1920s and 1930s. Only one maker is still alive, named Mr. Mazourek - he and his son are still working.

== Origin of the name ==
Since 1870, the violinists Johann and Josef Schrammel, together with Anton Strohmayer on the contraguitar, had performed in Georg Dänzer's quartet in Vienna. Dänzer was a celebrity for his virtuosity on the G-Clarinet. They played Ländlers, Polkas and "old dances".

When Georg Dänzer died in 1890, his place was taken by Anton Ernst, a cousin of Johann Schrammel's wife. Ernst was the first Schrammel accordion player, who also arranged music for the quartet and wrote a tutorial for his instrument. Within a very short time, this combination of two violins, accordion, and contraguitar was known as "Schrammelquartett"; their music, up to now in Vienna's chamber music tradition, being called Schrammelmusik.

== See also ==
- Bandoneon
