= Schrammeln =

1944 film directed by Géza von Bolváry

- Directed by: Géza von Bolváry
- Written by: Ernst Marischka (screenplay); Hans Gustl Kernmayr (story)
- Starring: See below
- Cinematography: Günther Anders
- Edited by: Arnfried Heyne
- Music by: Willy Schmidt-Gentner; Hans Schrammel; Josef Schrammel
- Release date: 3 March 1944
- Running time: 93 minutes
- Country: Germany
- Language: German

Schrammeln is a 1944 German film directed by Géza von Bolváry.

== Plot summary ==
A violinist(Schrammeln)'s brother publishes his unpublished songs in Vienna.

== Cast ==
- Marte Harell as Die Fiakermilli
- Hans Holt as Josef Schrammel
- Hans Moser as Anton Strohmayer
- Paul Hörbiger as Hans Schrammel
- Fritz Imhoff as Georg Dänzer
- Paula Pfluger as Theresa Schrammel
- Inge Egger as Barbara Strohmeyer
- Helli Servi as Franzi
- Robert Lindner as Anton Stelzer
- Oskar Wegrostek as Strubel, Fiaker
- Joseph Egger as Pfändungsbeamter
- Franz Pfaudler as Haslinger, Verleger
- Franz Böheim as Franz, Diener bei Haslinger

== Soundtrack ==
- Hans Holt - "Wenn ich nur wüßt"
- Hans Holt and Hans Moser - "'s Herz von an echten Weana (Schrammel Walzer)"
- Marte Harell - "So wie ich bin, ist auch mein Wien"
- Marte Harell, Hans Holt, Fritz Imhoff, Hans Moser and Paul Hörbiger - "Wer no in Wien net war und Linz net kennt"
- Hans Holt - "Man ist einmal nur verliebt!"
- Fritz Imhoff, Hans Moser and Paul Hörbiger - "Der Nachwuchs"
- Marte Harell - "Man ist einmal nur verliebt!"
- Hans Holt, Paul Hörbiger, Hans Moser and Fritz Imhoff - "Wien bleibt Wien"
