= Alois Strohmayer =

Austrian composer (1822–1890)

Alois Strohmayer (baptised 27 April 1822 – 16 March 1890) was an Austrian composer during the Romantic era.

== Biography ==
Alois Strohmayer was born in Lichtental, Vienna, and began writing classical music at the age of seventeen. He soon turned to write music for folk music ensembles with well-known musicians such as Georg Dänzer and the brothers Johann and Josef Schrammel. His compositions included waltzes, polkas, dances and marches, influenced by Johann Strauss Sr., Joseph Lanner and Schubert (who had studied with his father, Martin). He wrote primarily for an ensemble of two violins, bass guitar and woodwind instrument, flute or clarinet. He died in Vienna at the age of 78 in 1890.

For much of the 20th century, many of Alois Strohmayer's more than 200 compositions remained undiscovered; they were re-discovered by Viennese professor Lois Böck in 1971.

He was the father of Anton Strohmayer, a guitarist who founded with the Schrammel brothers the Schrammel Ensemble which, with the addition of Georg Dänzer, later became the Schrammel Quartet.
