= Donauinselfest =

Open-air music festival

Logo

The Donauinselfest (German for "Danube Island Festival") is a free open-air music festival which occurs annually at Donauinsel in Vienna, Austria. The festival is hosted by SPÖ Wien. It is the largest open-air music festival in the world, with around 3 million visitors over 3 days.

== The event ==
Performances take place in the festival area which is 4.5 km long and consists of 11 different open-air stages in 16 tented areas around the island. Stages are added or removed depending on the performance lineup. Local bands, DJs, and many world-famous artists have performed at the festival since its beginning in 1984.

According to numerous media reports, the Donauinselfest is among Europe's biggest open-air festivals with over 3 million visitors.

To ensure the safety of visitors, "house rules" were introduced in 2007 and checkpoint controls were established to help control certain items (such as glass and liquor inside the festival perimeter).

Food stands offer a variety of Austrian and international cuisine, including Thai, Greek, Italian, Hungarian cuisine, Indian, and Turkish. Although all concerts are free, financial experts estimate the event generates €40 million in city revenue due to increased tourism.

Traffic connection (how to get there):

- OEBB Travel Portal (trains)
- Austrian Airlines
- Wiener Linien (public transport in Vienna)

Areas referred to as "islands" are sponsored by radio stations, newspapers, and other companies.

== Rock the Island Contest ==
The winners of the RTIC (Rock the Island Contest), which is focusing on the support of talented Austrian newcomers, performed in the living room of their fans. This way, Austrian talents prepare themselves for their gig, and their fans experience a private live concert in their room.

== History ==
In 1983 Harry Kopietz, SPÖ politician, invented the organization of a one-day party near the Floridsdorferbrücke, to promote the attractiveness of the Donauinsel as a recreational area. Organizers expected some 15,000 people, but 160,000 showed up. The event became annual the following year (300,000 visitors) and meanwhile always attracts more than two million people during three days of activities (2.9 million in 2006, "only" 2.6 in 2007, as, due to a heavy thunderstorm, a few concerts had to be canceled on opening day).

=== 1993 ===
The most memorable concert was Falco's in 1993, in front of almost 100,000 fans: The band played during a torrential downpour and a lightning strike caused a power cut. Power was restored after ten minutes and the band continued their performance, to widespread acclaim.

=== 2003 ===
This year's headline included Bonnie Tyler, Shaggy and Melanie C.

=== 2004 ===
The headline band was Scorpions.

=== 2006 ===
2006 performers included Bloodhound Gang, Juli, Silbermond, Christina Stürmer, Fettes Brot, and Tocotronic.

=== 2007 ===
The 2007 Donauinselfest was partly successful. 2007 performers included Master Blaster, Gianna Nannini, Zucchero, Willi Resetarits, Hubert von Goisern, and Rainhard Fendrich whose concert attracted an audience of 200,000 people. Due to a thunderstorm warning, the Vienna Symphony Orchestra concert had to be canceled.

=== 2008 ===
In 2008, the festival was attended by Extremschrammeln, Gigi d'Agostino, Basshunter and Gabry Ponte. On the same stage, the Vienna Symphony Orchestra performed one of its open-air concerts on Monday evening.

=== 2009 ===
The 2009 Donauinselfest was on the verge of being canceled due to flooding. It had rained consistently for the last few days, making it necessary to open flood protection, which leveled out the water level on the sides of the Donauinsel but brings enough to flood the side paths, that would have provided an important escape route should it be necessary. Luckily, the water level sank and the roads were cleared in time, saving the event.

=== 2010 ===
In 2010, the highlights were Amy Macdonald, Billy Idol, as well as Paul van Dyk, Rainhard Fendrich, Milow and Sunrise Avenue.

=== 2011 ===
In 2011, performers such as Train, Söhne Mannheims, Andreas Gabalier and Darius & Finlay.

=== 2012 ===
The 29th Donauinselfest featured Simple Minds and Marlon Roudette.

=== 2013 ===
In 2013, the SPÖ Wien celebrated the 30th edition of the Donauinselfest. 600 hours of music, dancing, and fun. More than 2.000 performers in three days. Highlights were Rae Garvey, Amy Macdonald, Christina Stürmer, Wolfgang Ambros, Zucchero, Rainhard Fendrich and more.

=== 2014 ===
In 2014, the Donauinselfest featured performers such as: Cro, Adel Tawil, The Commodores, Macy Gray and Bilderbuch.

=== 2015 ===
In 2015, the festival was attended by Andreas Bourani, The Common Linnets, Taio Cruz, Anastacia and Robin Schulz.

=== 2016 ===
2016 presented Milow, Madsen, Sean Paul and Zoë.

=== 2017 ===
2017 offered a broad selection of musicians including Amy Macdonald, Cro, Michael Bolton and Sportfreunde Stiller.

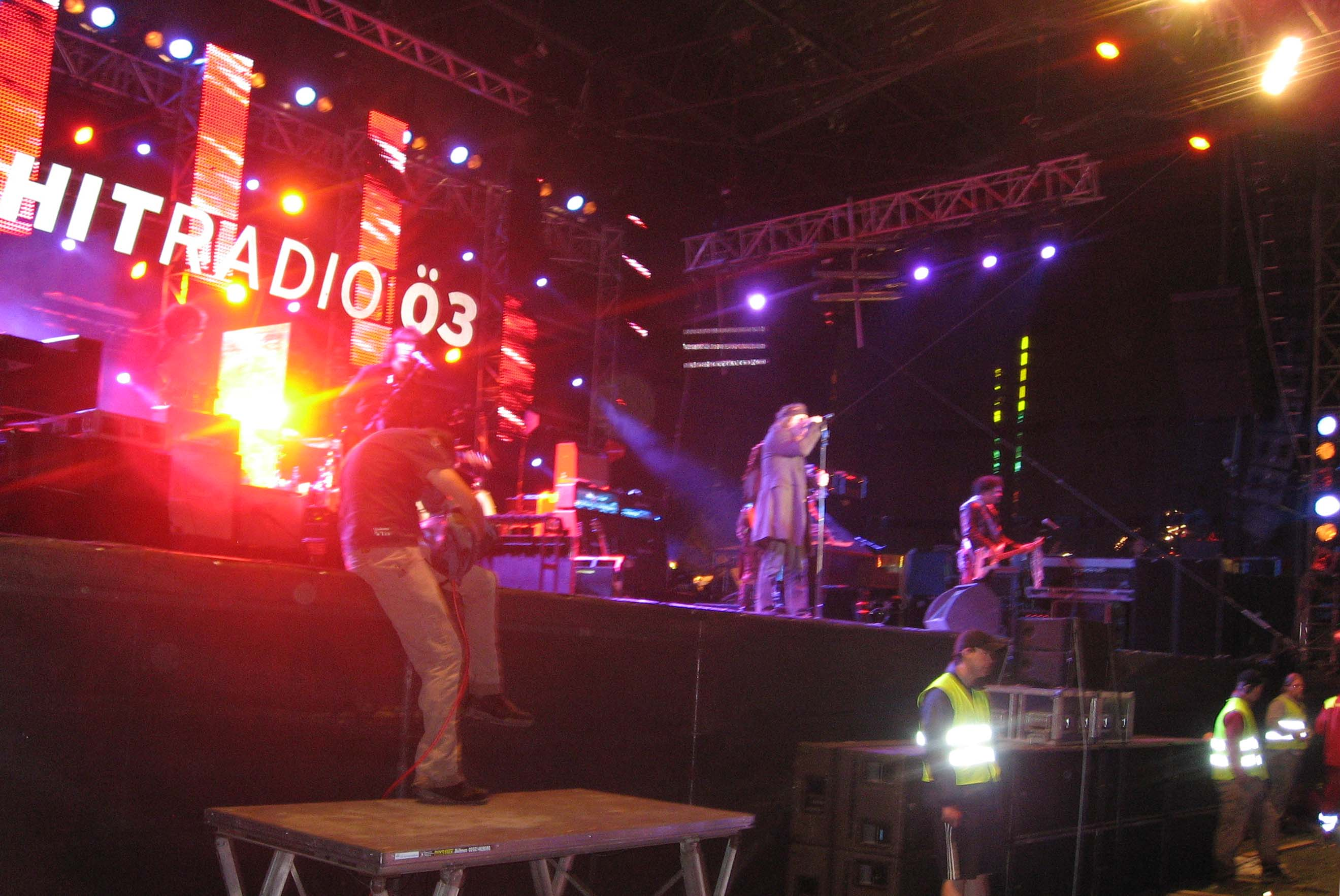
Zucchero in 2007

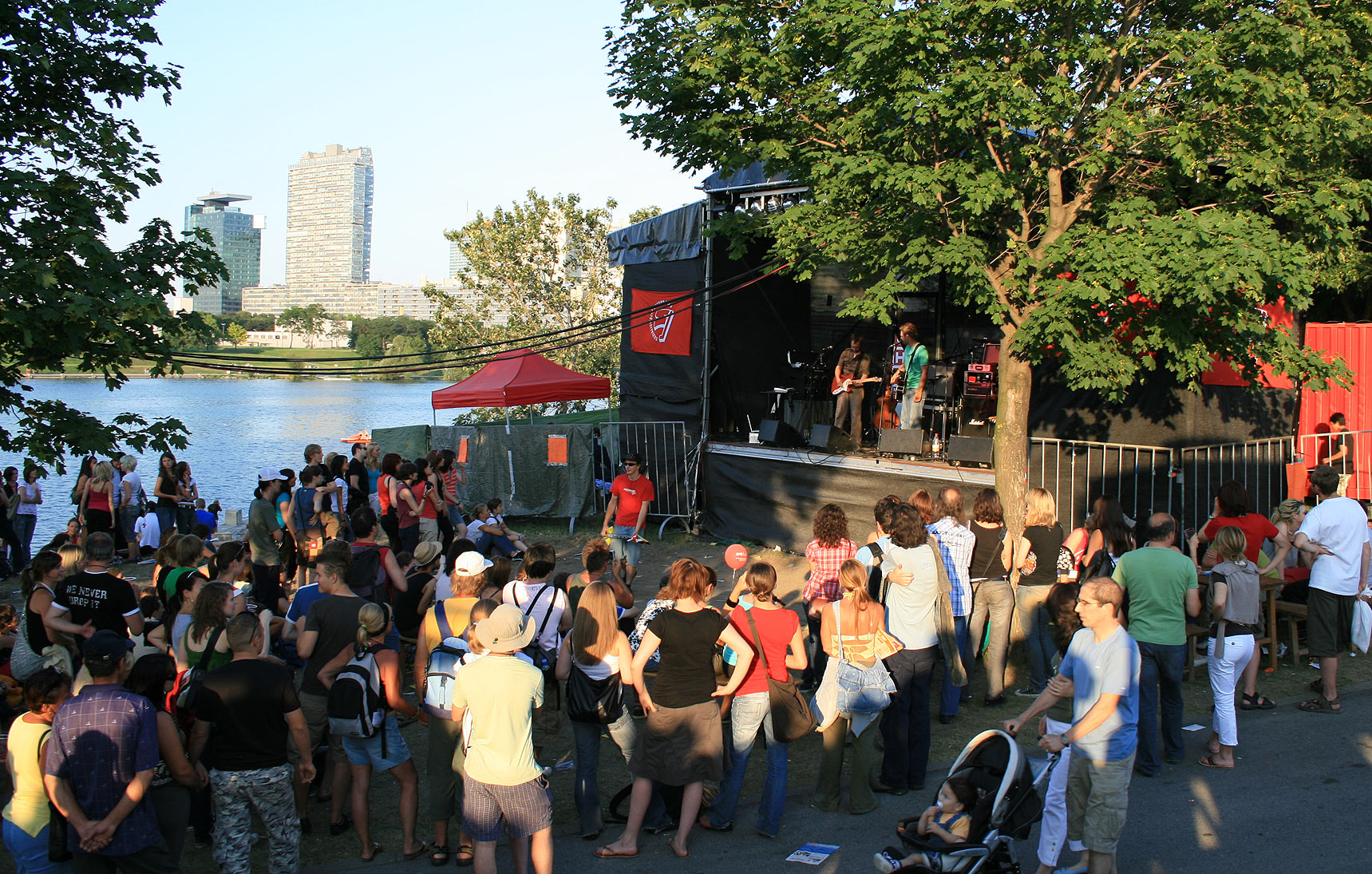
One of the small stages (Socialist Youth)

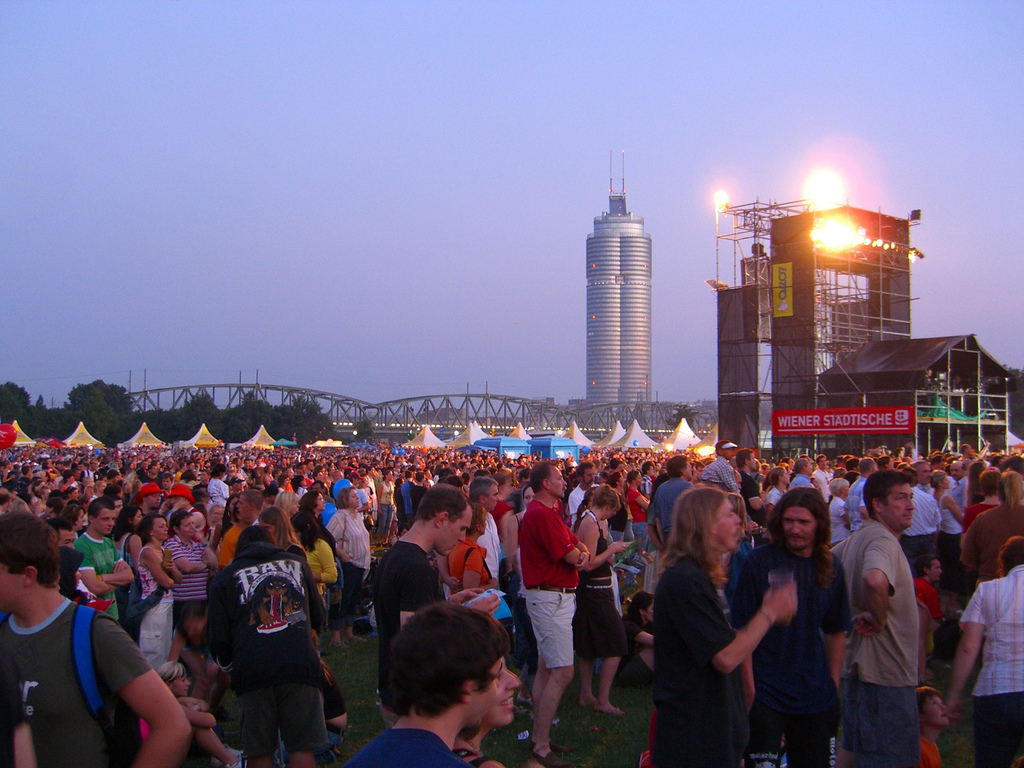
Masses in 2006

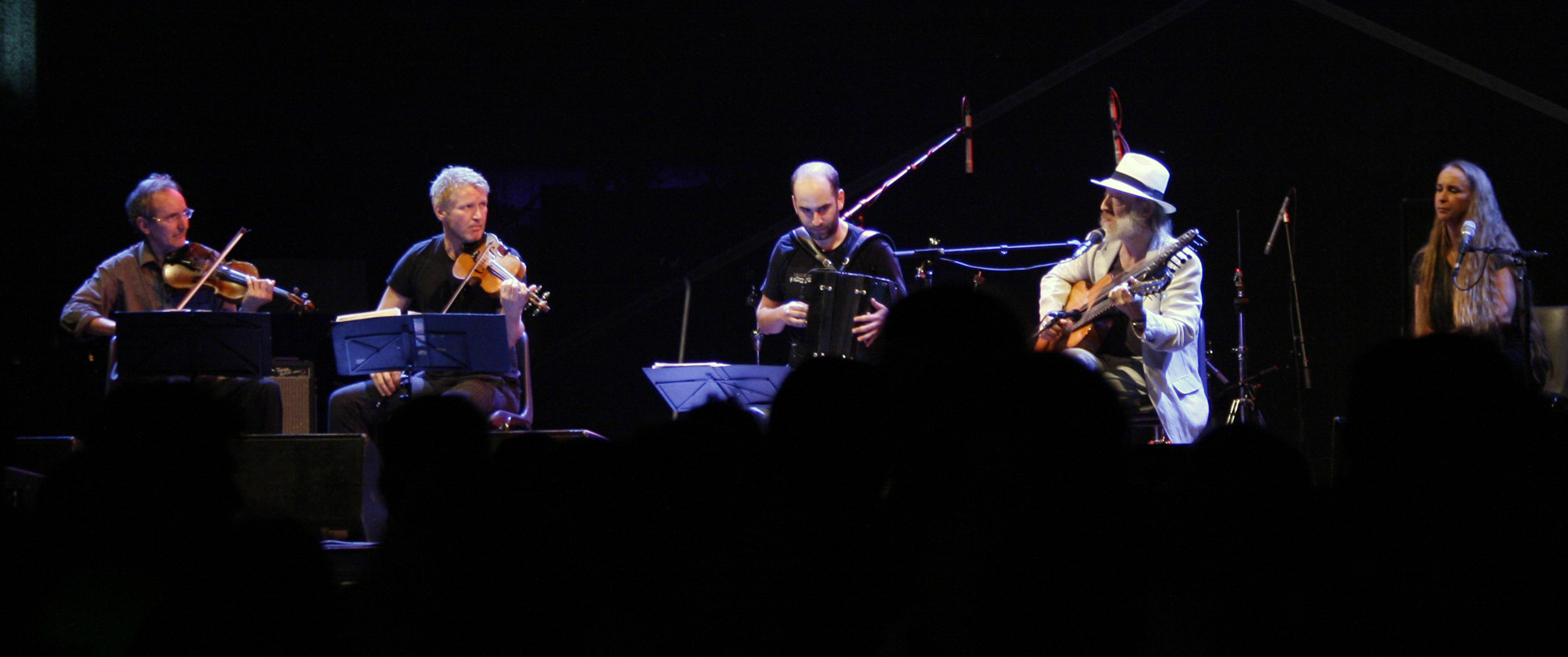
Extremschrammeln, 2008

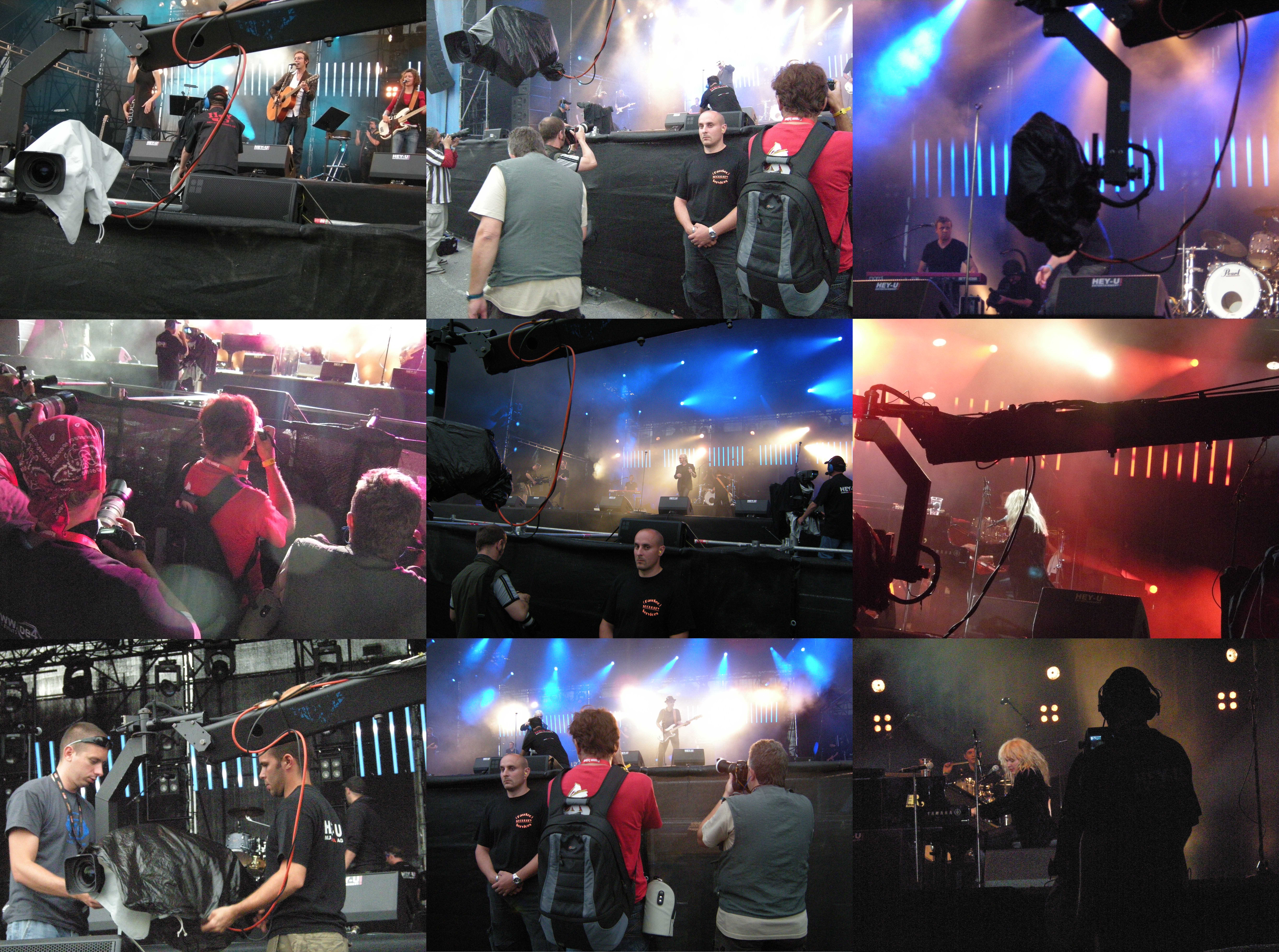
Donauinselfest potpourri, 2009.

== See also ==
- Donaufestival - annual festival of music and performance held in Krems, Austria
