= Schloss Neuwaldegg =

Château

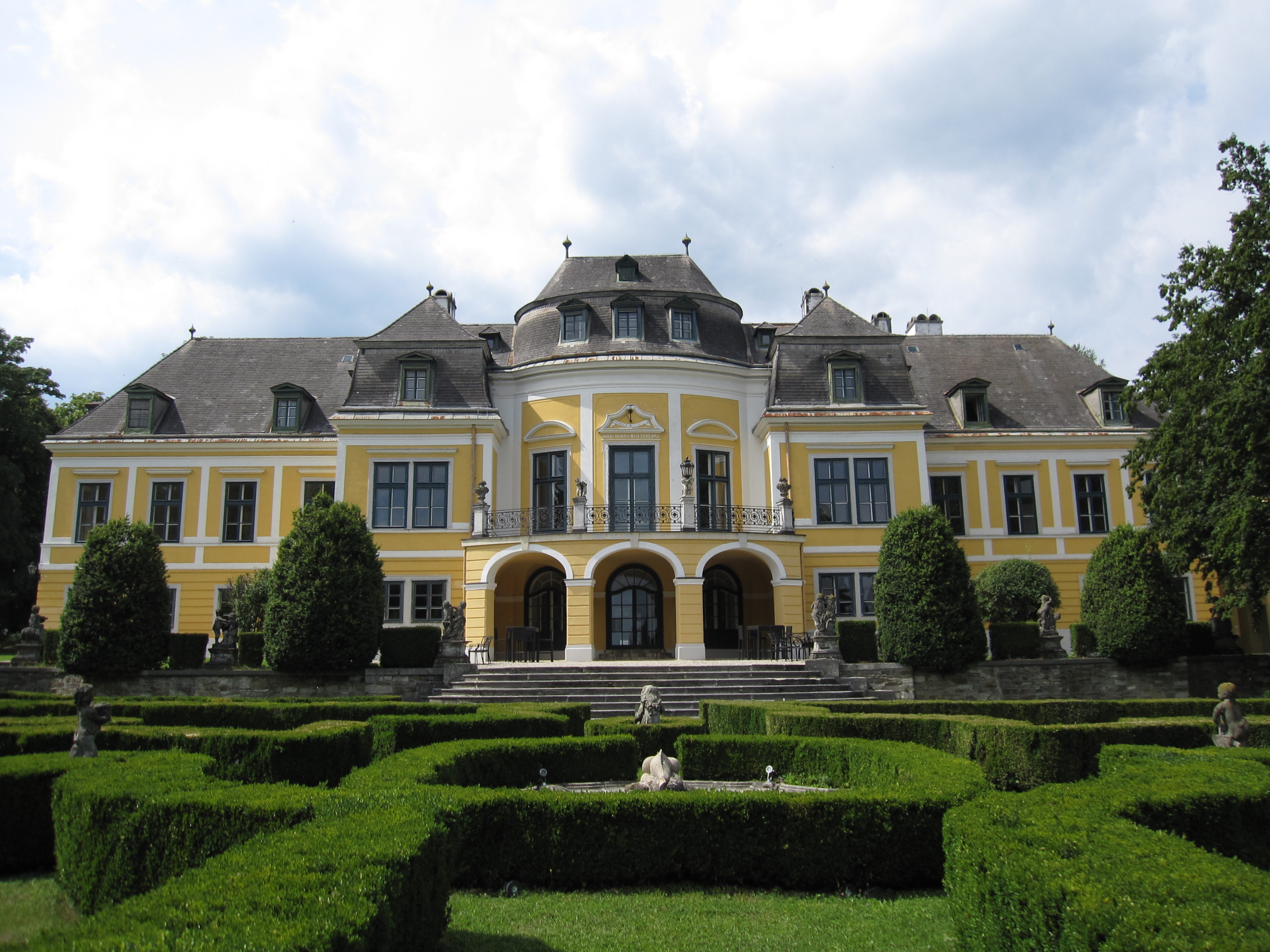
- Main façade and gardens

- Location within Vienna

General information
- Architectural style: Baroque
- Location: Hernals, Vienna, Austria
- Coordinates: 48°14′05″N 16°17′15″E
- Year built: c. 1697

Design and construction
- Architect: Johann Bernhard Fischer von Erlach

Schloss Neuwaldegg is a Baroque palace with an English garden in the Hernals borough of Vienna, Austria.^{1} It is currently privately owned and rented out for a variety of private and public events.

== History ==
Neuwaldegg manor arose from a farmstead acquired by the Imperial councillor Stefan Agler after the 1529 Siege of Vienna. Agler was ennobled to the rank of Ritter by the Habsburg emperor Ferdinand I and in 1539 received the title of an Edler of Paumgarten and Neuwaldegg.

The present-day palace was built around 1697 at the behest of Count Theodor von Strattman, most probably according to plans designed by Johann Bernhard Fischer von Erlach, and surrounded by a French formal garden. In 1765 Field Marshal Count Franz Moritz von Lacy, confidant of Empress Maria Theresa and her son Joseph II, purchased the estate. He had the building again enlarged and the English landscape park laid out, one of the first in the Habsburg monarchy. It included 17 reed cottages on the Hameau (French for "hamlet") hill to accommodate Lacy's guests, as well as a mausoleum built in 1794 that became his last resting place. When he opened his gardens to the public, they became a popular destination for Vienna day-trippers.

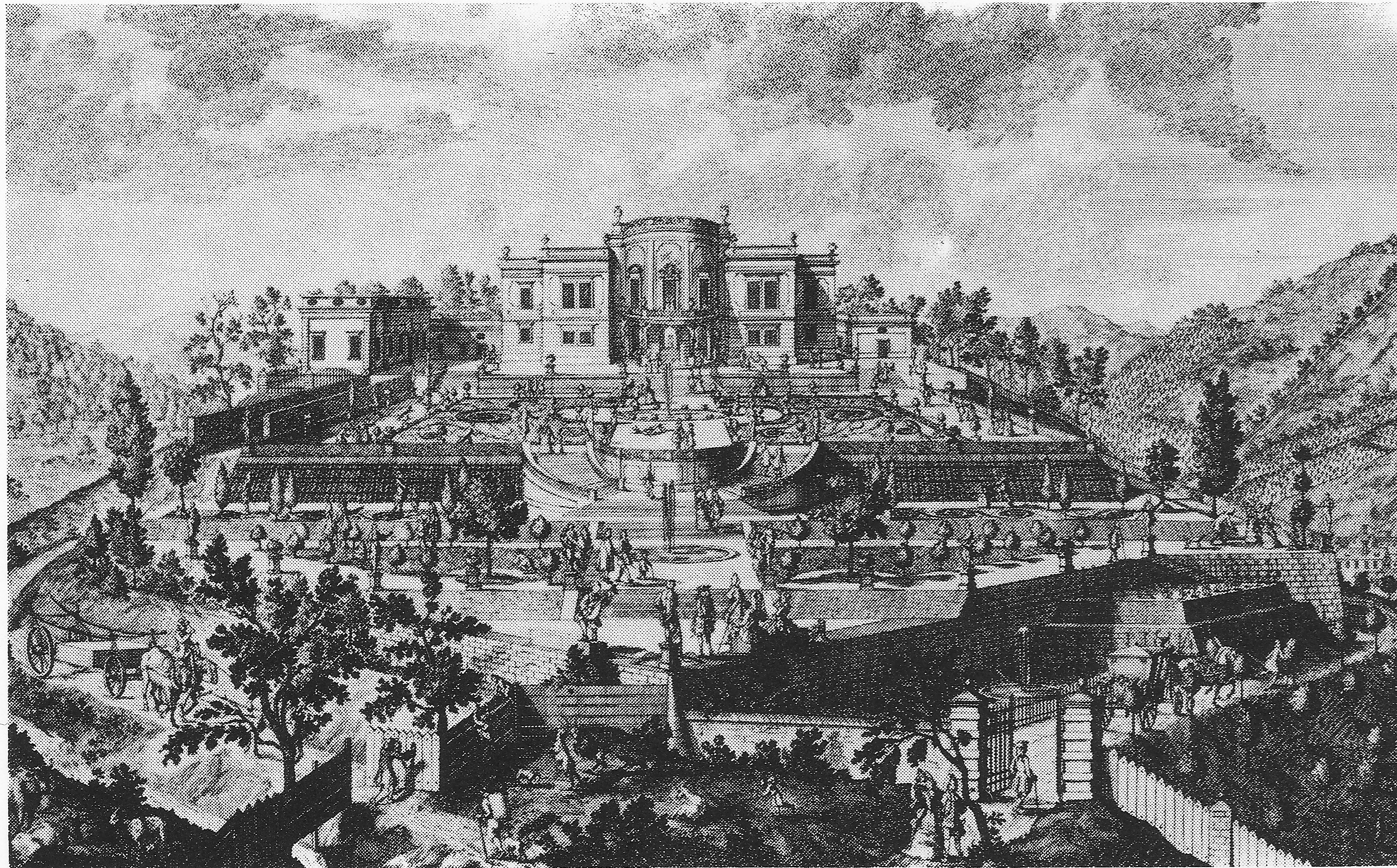
Schloss Neuwaldegg, 1719 engraving.

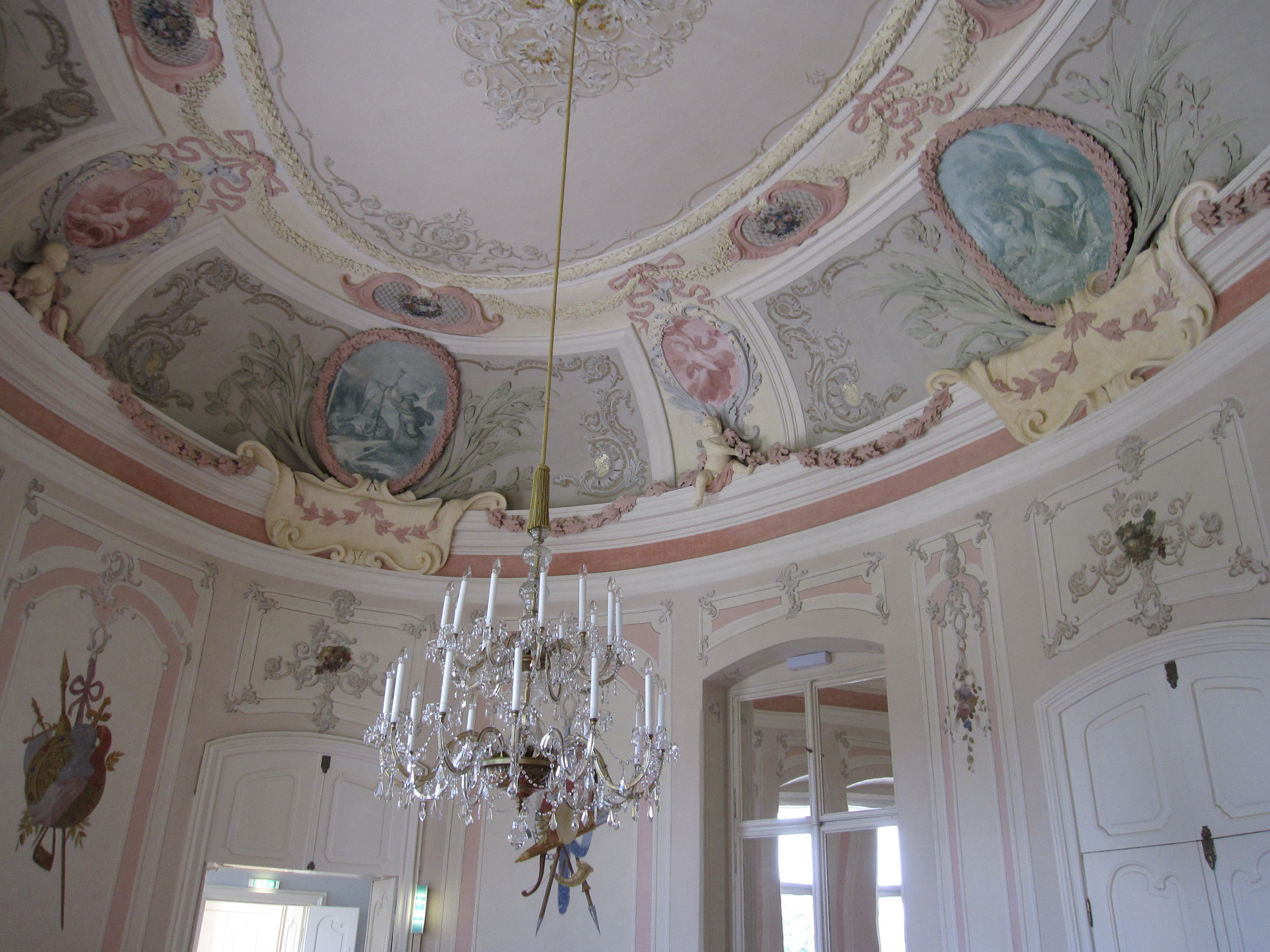
Interior.

After Lacy's death in 1801, the princely Schwarzenberg family bought the palace and the large landscape park, which up to today is called Schwarzenbergpark, featuring two obelisks located on the 2.2 km (1.4 mi) long Schwarzenbergallee avenue, along with a number of statues of Greek gods. However, the new owners had many art treasures transferred to Český Krumlov Castle in Bohemia, and over time the building and the gardens fell into a state of general neglect. Neuwaldegg was incorporated into the 17th district of Vienna on 1. January 1892. The Roman Catholic Archdiocese of Vienna finally bought the palace in 1951, while the park stretching uphill to the city limits was purchased by the municipal authorities in 1958 and has been redeveloped as a recreational area.

== In Culture ==
The castle was the location for the television film Grandma Rules from 2012 and Zurück ins Leben in 2013.

== Notes ==
^{1} The address is at XVII. Waldegghofgasse 3.
