= Anton Strohmayer =

Austrian musician (1848–1937)

Anton Strohmayer (25 January 1848 – 20 December 1937), born in Lichtental, Vienna, was an Austrian musician. His instruments were contraguitar and clarinet; a founding member of the "Schrammel Brothers Specialities Quartet", he played Schrammelmusik.

== Life and career ==
His father, Alois Strohmayer (1822-1890) was a composer.

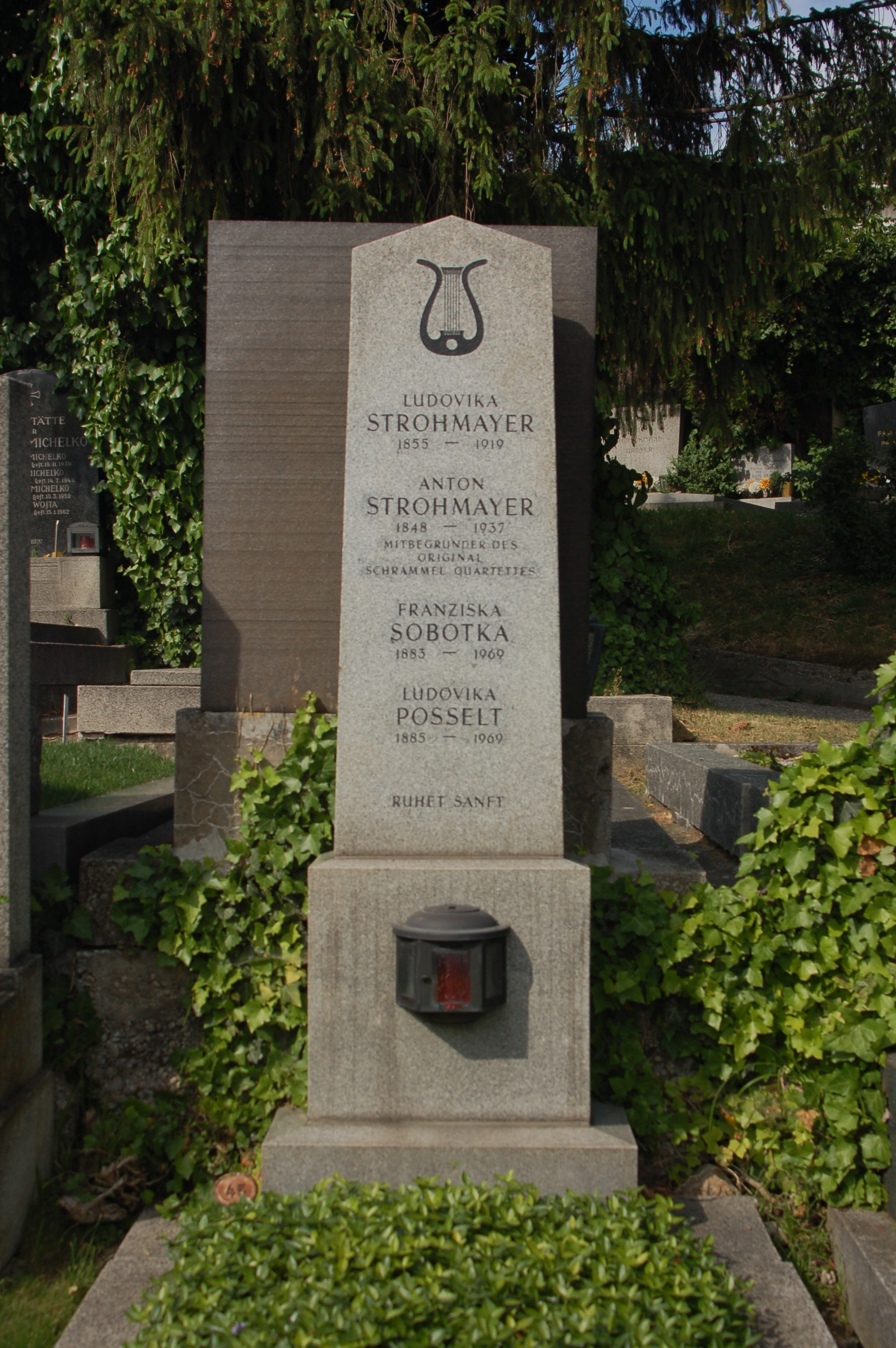
Anton Strohmayer's grave in Vienna

Strohmayer studied the guitar with his father Alois. As a boy, he already had similar ability to the brothers Johann and Josef Schrammel, two renowned Austrian guitarists who were taken in by his father to play guitar in restaurants across the city. At age 12, Strohmayer was taken by his father to play for the first time at the "Green Hunter" in the Prater.

In 1862 he played with Johann, Kaspar and Josef Schrammel in Hernals; from 1866 he played with Georg Dänzer and Josef Turnofsky; from 1873 in Wr. National Quartet, 1877 in the First Wr. National Quintet and from 1878 with Johann and Joseph Schrammel in the successful Nußdorfer Terzett (Gebrüder Schrammel and S.), which was expanded by the inclusion of dancer in 1884 to the quartet Gebr. Schrammel, Dänzer and S.

After the separation of the brothers Schrammel in 1892, he formed the quartet Danzer in 1893, performing in Chicago with Bela Kürty and Johann Wächter (violins), Dänzer (G-clarinet and posthorn), his son Willy S. (Guitar and harmonica) as well as the singers Marie Kiesel (see Koerber M. v.), Gusti Reverelli, Georg Edler, brothers Hirsch and the art piping Hans Tranquillini ("Baron Jean") as quintet Dänzer and S. In 1895 he acquired a Singspielhallen Concession and played as clarinetist in Wr. Specialty Quartet A. In 1905 he played in the Maxim Quartet.

He also played the violin, withdrew early from playing music. After the death of Danze (1893), with whom he often performed in duets, he was considered the last representative of the G-clarinet. His real. Significance, however, lies in the participation as a contragitarrist in the ensemble of the brothers Schrammel. Also successful were two of S's sons: Willy S. (1875-1959) as a harmonica player and singer, Franz S. (1881-1948) as a lieder singer.

His grave is located on the Dornbacher cemetery in Vienna.

== See also ==
- Josef Schrammel
- Johann Schrammel

== Literature ==
- "Strohmayer Anton". In: Österreichisches Biographisches Lexikon 1815–1950 (ÖBL). Vol. 13, Austrian Academy of Sciences, Vienna 2010, ISBN 978-3-7001-6963-5, p. 421 f. (Direct links to "p. 421", "p. 422")
- Margarethe Egger: Die „Schrammeln“ in ihrer Zeit. Österreichischer Bundesverlag, Wien 1989, ISBN 3-215-07219-X.
