= Hernals =

Coordinates: 48°13′57″N 16°16′46″E

Hernals Hernois (Bavarian)
- 17th District of Vienna
- Coat of arms

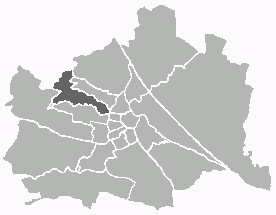
- Location of the district within Vienna
- Country: Austria
- City: Vienna

Government
  - District Director: Peter Jagsch (SPÖ)
  - First Deputy: Karin Prauhart (Grüne)
  - Second Deputy: Elisabeth Mössmer-Cattalini (SPÖ)
  - Representation (40 Members): SPÖ 14, Grüne 12, FPÖ 6, NEOS 4, ÖVP 4, KPÖ 2

Area
  - Total: 11.35 km^{2} (4.38 sq mi)

Population (2016-01-01)
  - Total: 56,342
  - Density: 4,964/km^{2} (12,860/sq mi)
- Postal code: A-1170
- Address of District Office: Elterleinplatz 14; A-1170 Wien
- Website: www.wien.gv.at/bezirke/hernals/

Hernals (German pronunciation: [hɛʁˈnals]; Viennese: Hernois) is the 17th district of Vienna, Austria (German: 17. Bezirk, Hernals). Hernals is in northwest Vienna. It was annexed in 1892 out of the townships of Hernals, Dornbach, and Neuwaldegg.

== Geography ==
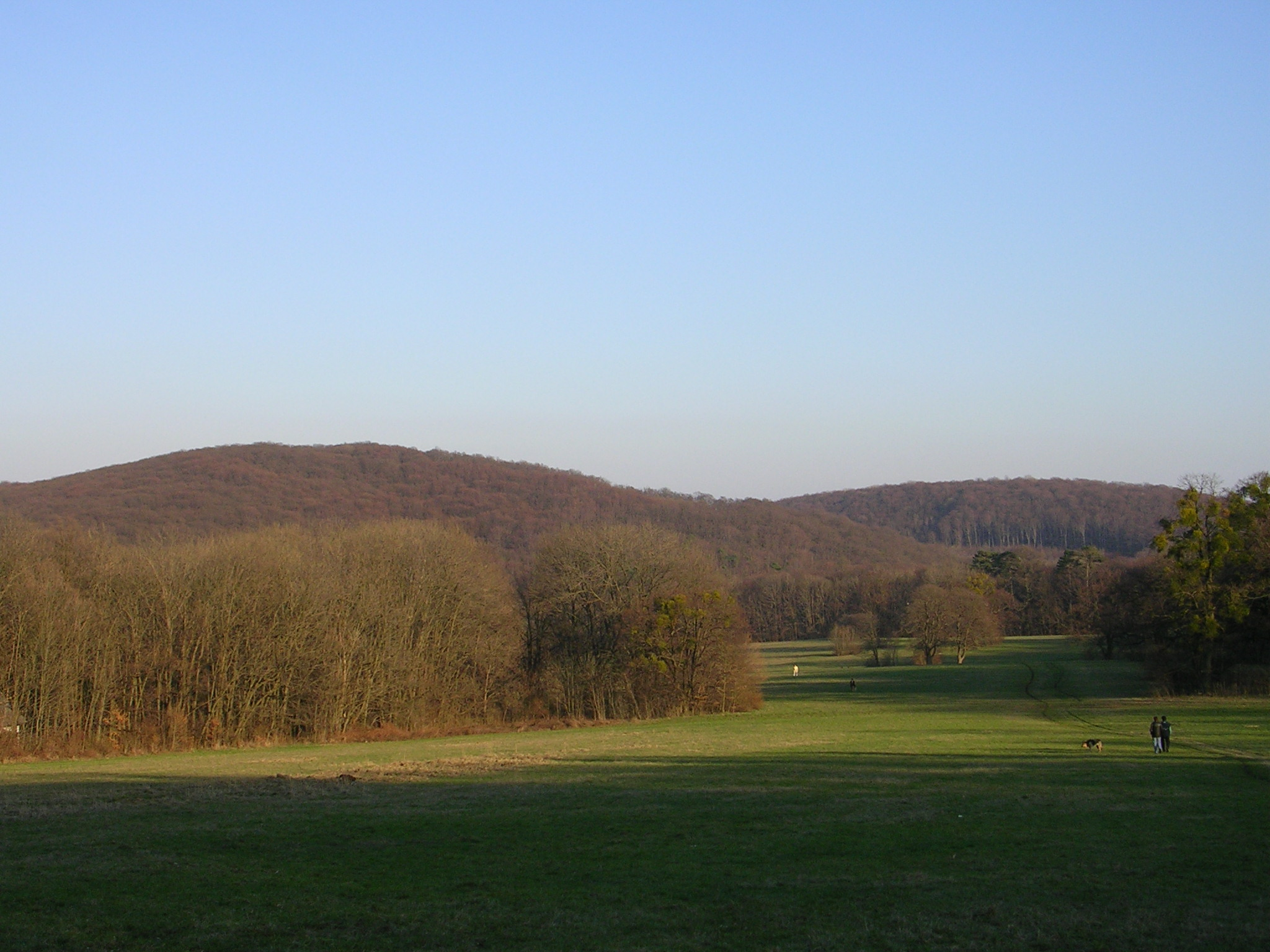
Michaelerberg and Schafberg.

The district of Hernals stretches out along the canals of the Als River west of Vienna between the Wienerwald (Vienna Forest) and the Gürtel (a main street around inner Vienna). The Als is the second-longest stream (the longest is the Wien River) to flow from the Wienerwald into the Danube. The highest point, at 464 meters, is Heuberg. The original Vororte of Hernals, Dornbach, and Neuwaldegg were annexed in 1892 and form the heart of the 17th district. The houses in the central areas were built around the turn of the 19th–20th centuries during the Gründerzeit. Further out, the original farmer houses remain, often with gardens and villas added on. Farmland composes about 29.7% of the land area of the district, and transportation support buildings compose about 10.3% of the area. With about 59.6% of the area populated with greenery, Hernals is one of the greenest districts in Vienna, with 39.6% forest and 14% smaller gardens and meadows. Agriculture composes only 1.4% and plays little role today. The wineries have mostly retreated into the hills of Schafberg and belong to the Roman Catholic parish of Dornbach.

=== Land use ===
The developed area of Hernals covers 29.7% (Vienna citywide: 33.3%) of the district area. The proportion of residential area in the built-space is 90.9%, the 2nd highest in Vienna. Accordingly, the proportion of farm land (2.8%) and land for the cultural, religious, sporting or public sector (5.4%), in the developed area, is limited.

Greenspace in Hernals covers 59.6%, by which Hernals is the 3rd greenest district. Nearly 66.5% of the greenspace falls in forests, 12.1% in meadows, and 11.4% in small gardens. The outdoor sports and recreation areas (3.7%) use only a small amount of Hernalser greenspace. The former major wine-growing region has all but disappeared on Schafberg hill.

The proportion of trafficked area in the district is 10.3%, very low. Waters cover 0.4% of the district area.

Space allocation in 2001
Builtspace			Greenspace						Water	Transport areas
336.9			675.9						4.01	117.01
Residences	Operations	Public Facilities	Farms	Parks	Forests	Meadows	Small gardens	Rec. areas		
306.1	9.55	18.25	15.88	27.2	449.4	76.88	81.48	25.05		

== History ==
=== Hernals to 1918 ===
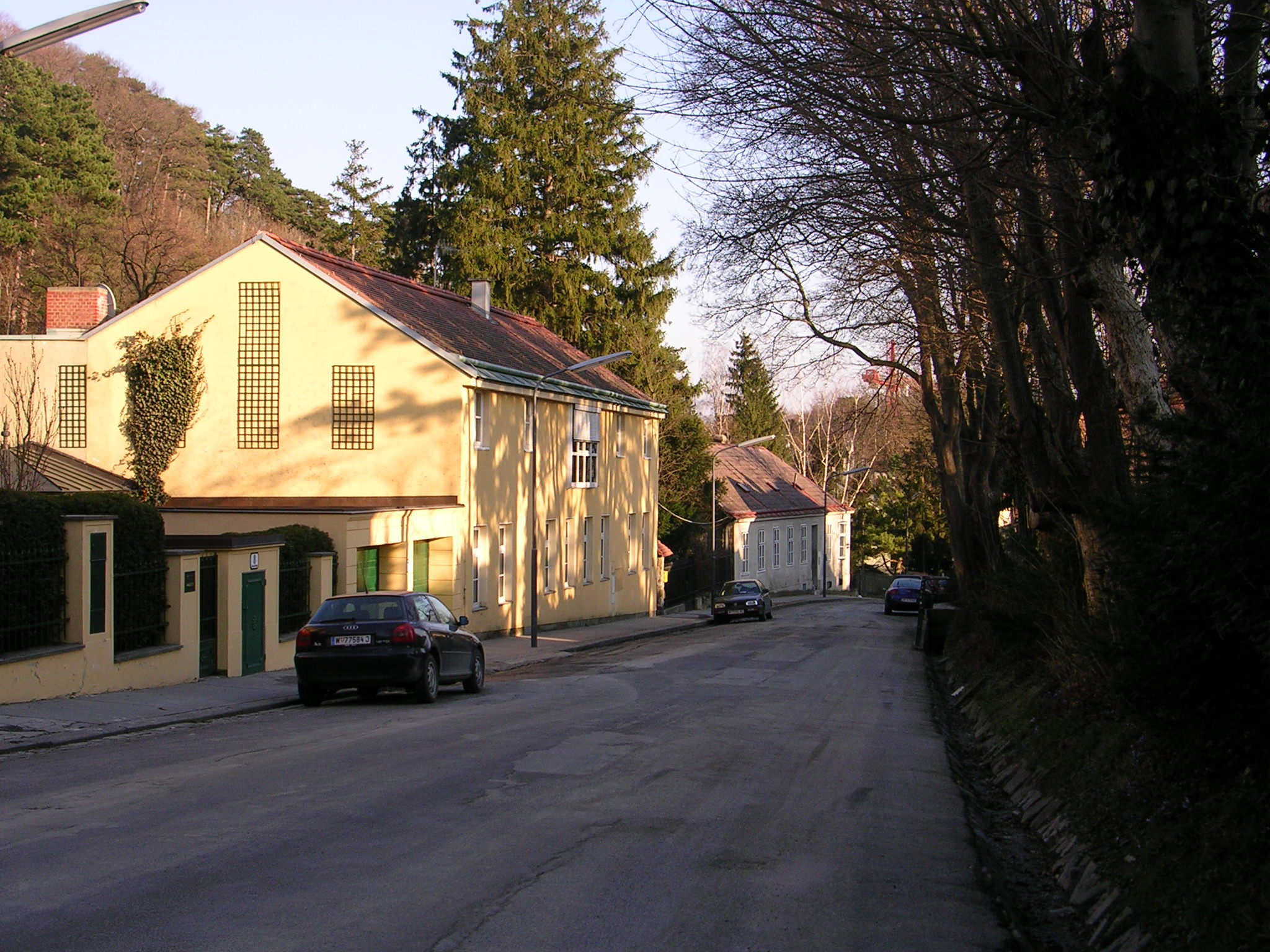
Artariastrasse in Neuwaldegg.

Archaeological digs place the first settlements in the Hernals district in the Neolithic Era, near the Als Stream, whose waters were teaming with fish. Digs from the Roman times reveal brickyards near today's Elterleinplatz. During the Middle Ages, the villages (Vororte) of Hernals and Dornbach were built along the Als, while Neuwaldegg was founded at the start of the Modern Era.

The founding of Hernals as the 17th district of Vienna came during the end of the 19th century. After the suburb cities (Vorstädte) of Vienna were annexed in 1850, discussions began in the 1870s to annex more of the surrounding areas. Although the areas were against such an annexation, Emperor Franz Joseph I declared in 1888 that it would be so. The decree took effect on January 1, 1892 and united Hernals, Dornbach, and Neuwaldegg together as the 17th district. At that time, the Hernals township was the most significant of the three and was the most populous township of Lower Austria beside Vienna.

In 1890, 74,657 people and 1,803 houses composed the newly established district. District director Kretschek and the advisor of the Hernals township Sebastian Grünbeck re-established the St. Anna Chapel, the building of the Jörgerbad spa, the building of various schools, administration of the streets, and expansions of the Hernals cemetery. In 1894, the city wall was torn down and the rail lines were built. The Hernalser Market was moved to Zimmermannplatz.

=== Hernals 1919-1945 ===
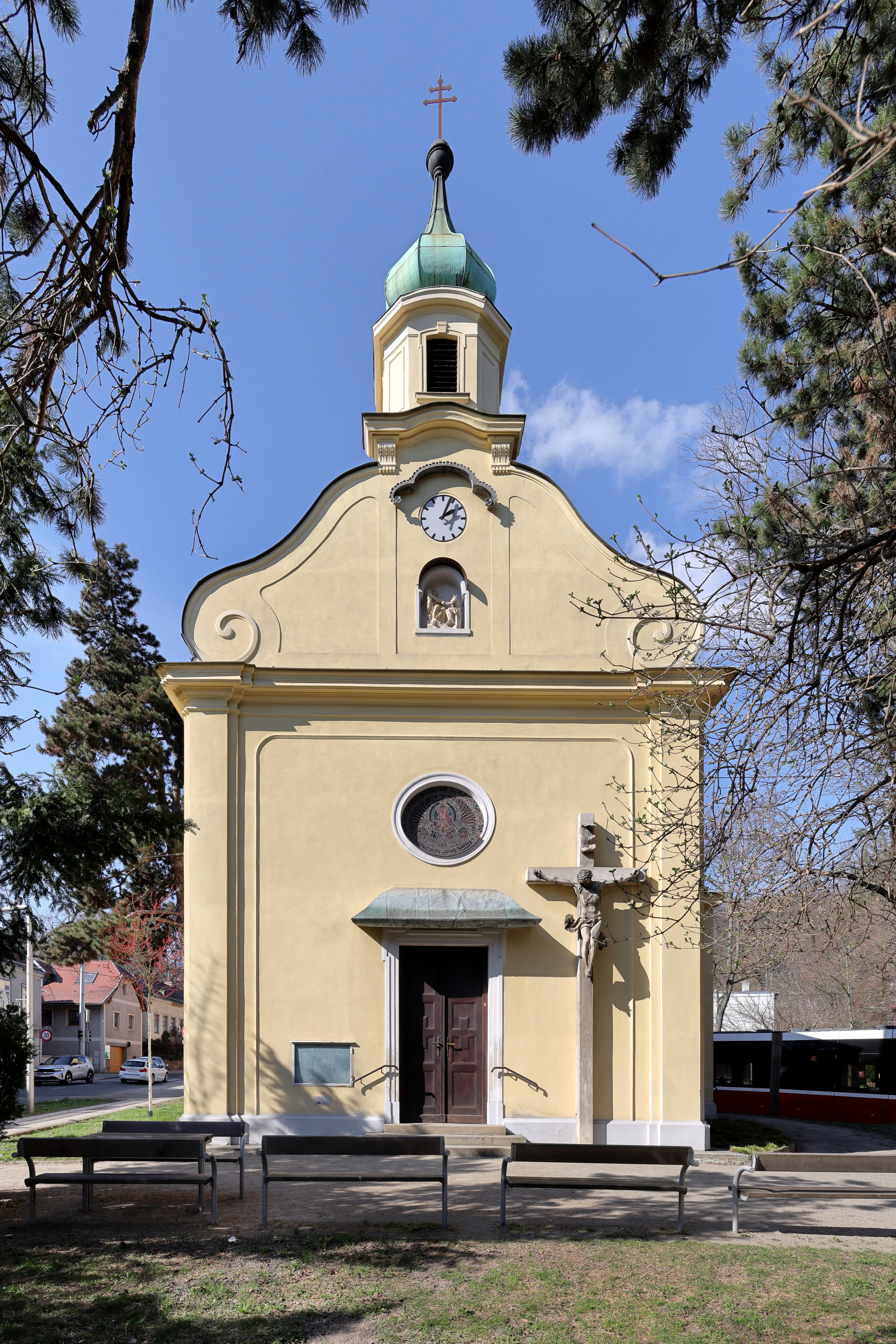
St. Anna Chapel in Dornbach.

After World War I, the social democrats initiated the municipal construction of housing estates (Gemeindebauten) in Hernals. In 1922, Karl Ehn built 164 new apartments in Balderichgasse. The largest Gemeindebau erected between the world wars in Hernals was completed in 1929 in Wattgasse, where 294 apartments were built. The expansion was halted due to financial pressures in the Austrian government, and the number of community apartments remained below the Vienna average at 1,467.

As a largely proletarian district, Hernals became unstable after the Schattendorf Executions, and on July 15, 1927 the police attacked 158 people in Hernalser Hauptstraße. Enraged protesters stormed the police station at Hernalser Hauptstraße 158 and set fire to the police equipment on the street. Two trees that had been damaged by the fire were later cared for as "revolutionary trees" but finally died in the mid-30s. The unrest escalated further on June 16 when five people lost their lives. However, the Austrian Civil War in February 1934 took place outside of Hernals only. With the prohibition of the social democrats, a new district government was installed.

=== Hernals since 1945 ===
The end of the second World War was marked by the Soviet troops marching into Hernals on April 7, 1945. They stayed until September, when they were absolved by the American occupation forces. In addition to rebuilding the destroyed houses, the main focus was placed on building new homes. In the span from 1945 to 1955 alone, 1,050 apartments were built; 2,948 more were built in the years up to 1991.

Since the 1990s, there have been five smaller changes in district boundaries. In 1990, the border with the Währing District was moved, in the area between the streets Czartoryskigasse and Herbeckstraße, which meant a small loss of territory for Hernals. In 1992, in the area of Savoyenstraße, Wilhelminenstraße and Oberwiedenstraße, Hernals gained a small undeveloped area from the Ottakring district.[5] Then in 1995, Hernals gained a residential area from the Währing District, in the area of the roads Höhenstraße, Keylwerthgasse und Salmannsdorfer Straße. In 1998, the border with Ottakring was moved north (in the area of Spinozagasse street between Steinmüllergasse and Rosenackerstraße).[7] The most recent boundary change took place in 2001, in the area of Kongresspark, which since then has remained entirely in the Ottakring District.

== Population ==
Population Growth
Data from Statistik Austria

=== Population development ===
At the founding of the district, at the end of the 19th century, the district had 74,696 residents. Up until 1910, the population grew by over 60 percent, to 103,000. Since then, however, the population gradually declined, until the growth resumed in 2001. Only in the 1980s, there had been a slight population growth in Hernals, but the population shrank again, to a low of 47,621 in 2001. Since 2001, now as in the other counties, a strong population growth, of 10% in 5 years, has been observed.

=== Population structure ===
The age of the population in the Hernals District (during 2007) matches the average for Vienna. The composition of the population is very similar to the rest of Vienna:

- 21.4% are older than 60
- 52.8% are women
- 28.8% are foreigners (slightly higher than the Vienna average), of which:
  - 33.9% come from Serbia and Montenegro
  - 14.7% come from Turkey
  - 9.7% come from Bosnia
  - 4.8% come from Somalia

=== Religious denominations ===
The population is made of the following religions:

- 47.4% Roman Catholic
- 9.4% Eastern Orthodox
- 9.4% Islamic
- 4.1% Protestant
- 23.4% undeclared

== Politics ==
=== District Government ===
District Directors from 1945
Alois Brunner (KPÖ)	4/1945-1946
Leopold Pernerstorfer (SPÖ)	1946–1949
Karl Panek (SPÖ)	1949–1965
Josef Veleta (SPÖ)	1965–1979
Robert Pfleger (SPÖ)	1979–1997
Hans Mentschik (SPÖ)	1997–2002
Ilse Pfeffer (SPÖ)	2002-2022
Peter Jagsch (SPÖ)	2022-

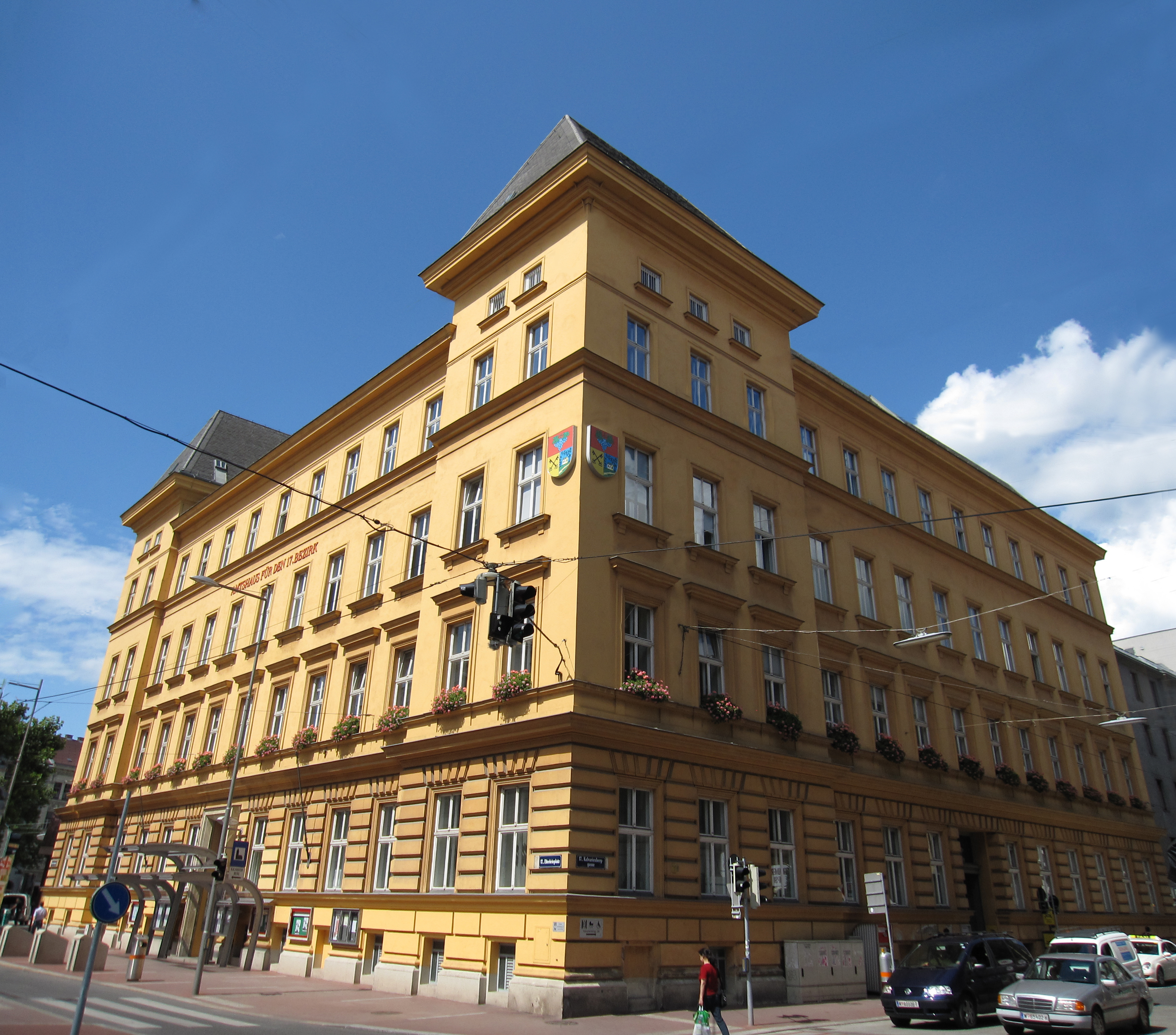
District Office.

Hernals was governed by the Christian Social Party during the turn of the 19th/20th centuries. The former mayor of Hernals, Elterlein, became the first district director, and Karl Ketschek followed him in the years 1905 to 1919. During the first general vote, the Social Democrats garnered 58% of the vote, with the Christian Socials (27%) and the Czechoslovak Social Democrats following behind. These ratios remained steady until 1932, when the Czechs disappeared and the Christian socialists lost some of their power (fell to 17%). Anton Haidl, a social democrat, occupied the position as director from 1919 until 1934.

In the first vote in November 1945, the SPÖ gathered the majority of the vote (57%) and has continued to hold the director position up to today. The supremacy of the SPÖ melted during the 1990s as the FPÖ gained popularity. The SPÖ's 43% in 1991 shrank to 33.4% in 1996. The FPÖ had gathered an additional 6.27%, to give them 28.46% of the vote, just barely trailing the SPÖ. The trend reversed itself in 2001: SPÖ had 39.90% and FPÖ had 20.81%. The ÖVP were only slightly behind, at 19.54%, and the Green party had 15.31%.

In 2010 the SPÖ lost 3.8% and now has 37.3%, the ÖVP lost 4% and has 17.8%, the Greens reached won 1.9% and has now 20.3%, the FPÖ increased 6.1% points and now has 20.7% and therefore the Second Deputy (which the ÖVP held formerly). The LiF (lost 0.4% and reached 1.1%), the KPÖ (stagnated at 1.4%) and the BZÖ (this time increased 0.3% points and now has 1.4%) didn't get a seat in the District Proxy of Hernals.

=== Coat of arms ===

The coat of arms of Hernals is divided into three parts, which represent the former three constituent parts: Hernals, Dornbach, and Neuwaldegg.

The upper half represents Hernals and displays blue grapes on a red background, which represents the former vineyard way of life. The lower-left part represents the town of Dornbach and displays two crossed silver keys on a golden background. The keys symbolise the Benedictine St. Peter Monastery in Salzburg. The lower-right part represents Neuwaldegg and displays a meadow with a small house, two trees, and a road, which symbolise the former residence of the governor.

== Culture and sights ==
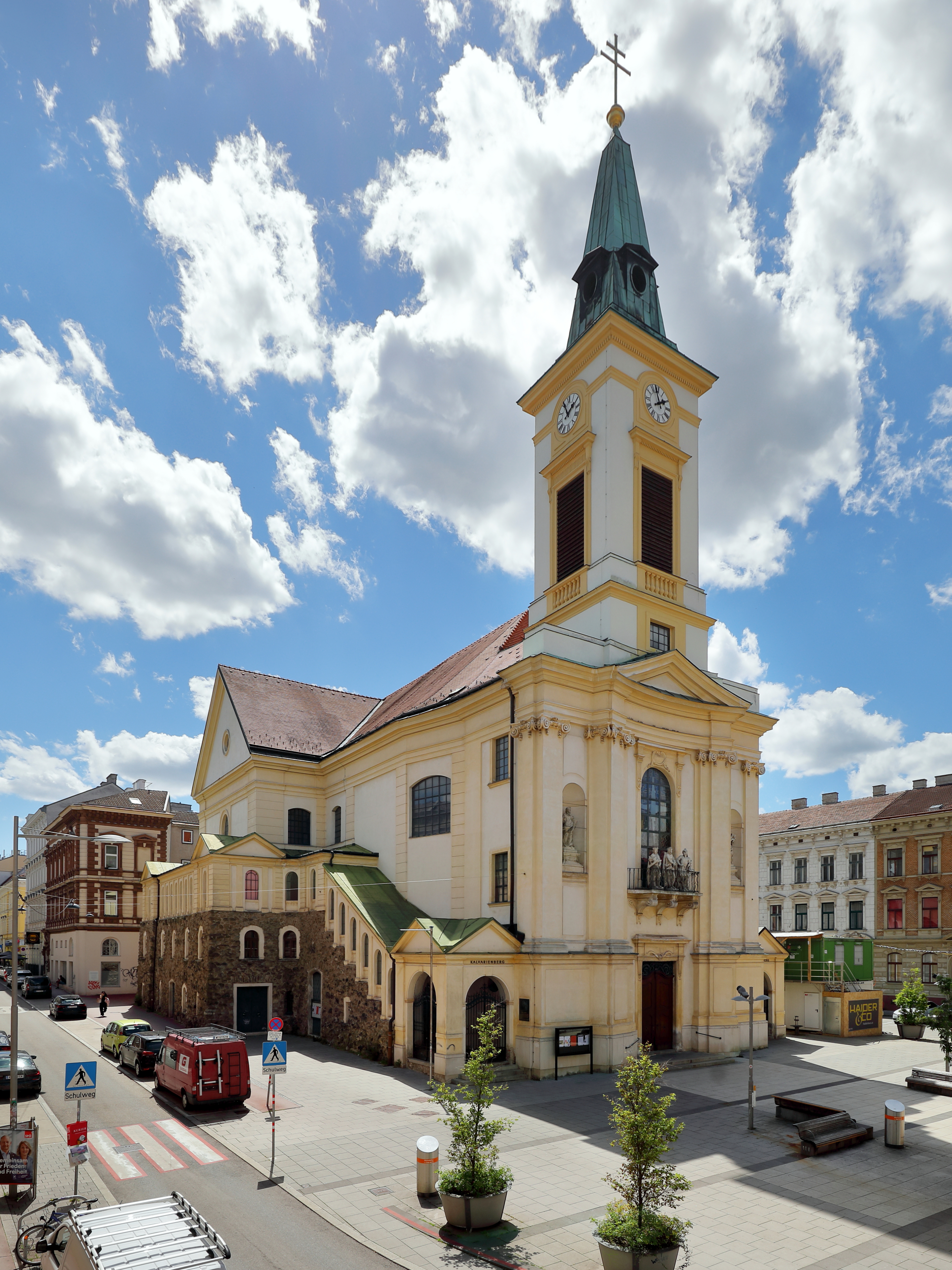
Kalvarienbergkirche.

=== Sightseeing ===
The most substantial churches worth seeing in Hernals are the Kalvarienbergkirche, the Sühnekirche, and the Marienpfarre. Other sites worth seeing are the Jörgerbad spas and the Alszauberbrunnen (Als magic wells) with statues of the brother composers Johann and Josef Schrammel. The Dornbach Pfarrkirche and the Annen Chapel are in Dornbach, and in Neuwaldegg are the Schloss Neuwaldegg (castle) and the Schwarzenbergpark (park).

=== The history of theatre in Hernals ===
Theatre groups in Hernals had little success in the early years. The "Erste Wiener Nationalarena" was started as a summer theatre in place of the Josefstädter Theater that was closed during the revolution in 1848. This theatre, however, closed soon after. In 1966, the Dornbach Theater opened and closed only six months later. There were a few smaller theatres in the time between the world wars. Near the corner of Dornbacherstraße and Vollbadgasse, the "Theater in Dornbach" replaced a former Operetta stage with a peasant stage. Despite the sold-out shows, the theatre nevertheless closed only one year later due to financial problems. Today, Hernals has two important and well-known stages: the traditional Wiener Metropol presents musicals, concerts, and cabaret; and the true cabaret theatre Kulisse Cabaret.

=== Museums ===
The main museums in Hernals are the Hernals District History Museum ( German), a carriage museum, and the Rettungsmuseum (museum about rescues).

=== Parks ===
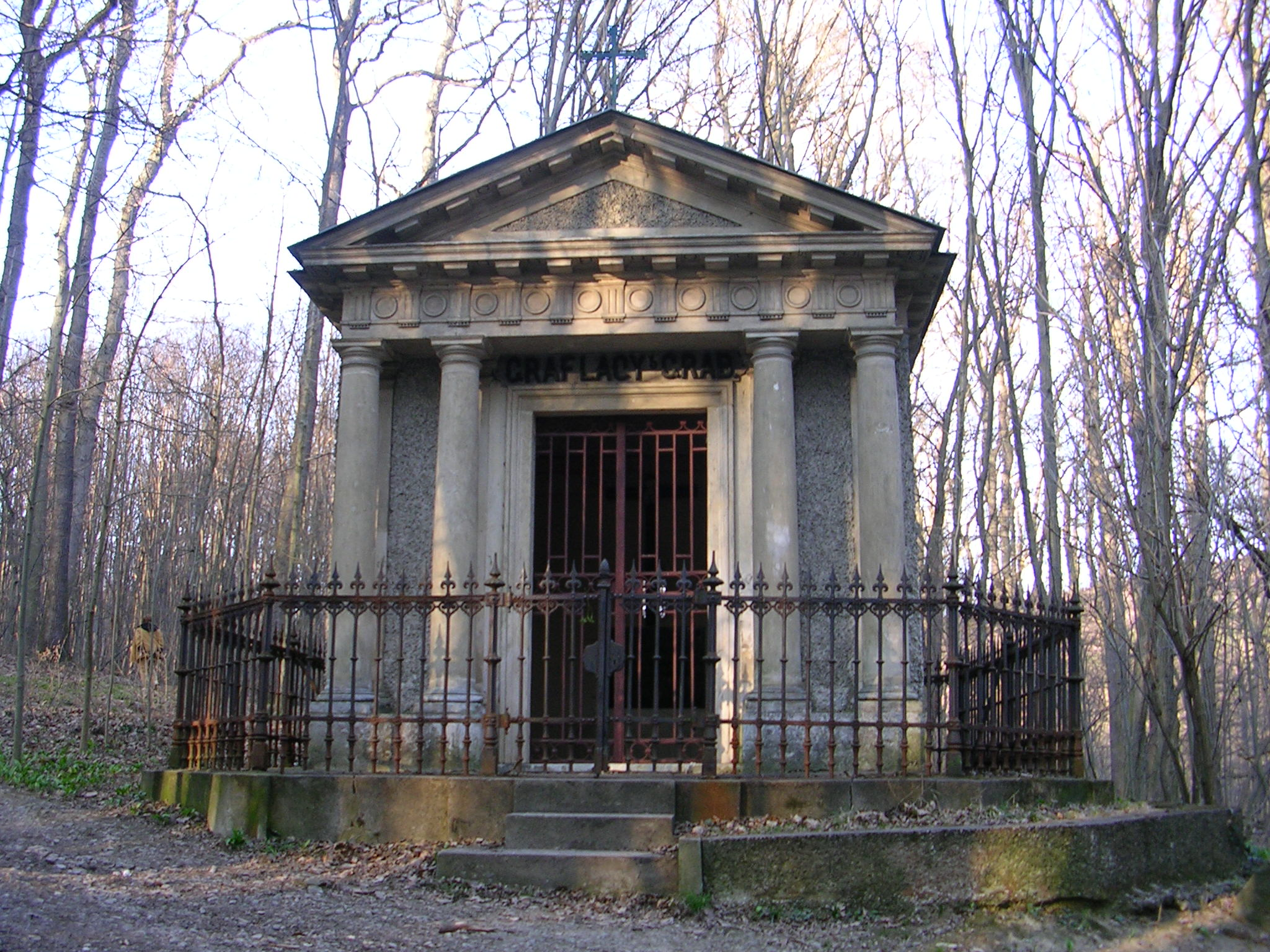
Lacy Grabmal in Schwarzenbergpark.

- Schwarzenbergpark (800,000 m²) is in Neuwaldegg is the oldest landscape garden in Austria and nestles the Wienerwald.
- Lidlpark (17,000 m²) is full of Japanese cherry trees.
- Alexander-Lernet-Holenia-Park (900 m²) is in Dornbach
- Josef-Kaderka-Park (5,300 m²) is in Dornbach
- Pezzlpark (3,000 m²) in Hernals.

== Economy and Infrastructure ==
=== Public Facilities ===
The only hospital in Hernals is the Krankenhaus Göttlicher Heiland (Hospital of the Divine Saviour), built by the congregation of the Schwestern vom göttlichen Erlöser (an order of Catholics called the Salvatorians) in 1935. The area also has two spas/bathhouses: the Schafbergbad and the more traditional Jörgerbad, which was built in 1914 after the style of the Vienna workshops.

=== Economy ===
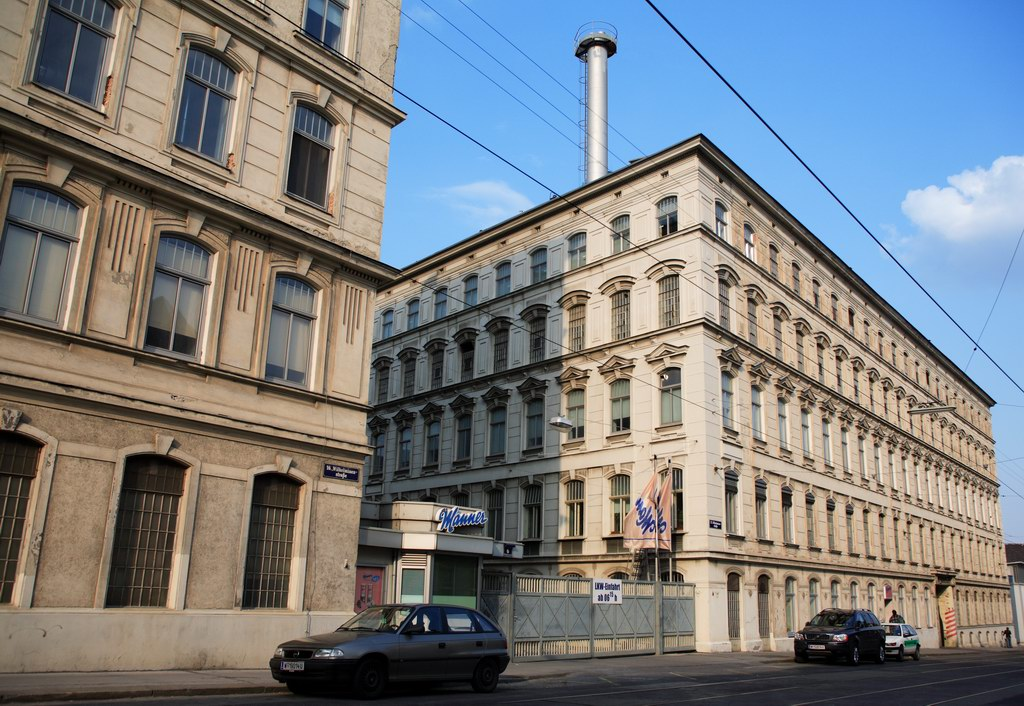
Manner factory

Only a few of the numerous industries and trades erected during the industrialisation of the district still remain. Agriculture, manufacturing, and light industry are among the survivors. Today, there are 350 to 400 firms located in Hernals, composed of 2,221 workplaces with 18,000 workers. Two-thirds are civil-service–oriented industries, 23% in trade and industry and 8% in construction. Only about 120 people are still active in the once-prevalent agriculture (predominantly vineyards) industry. Almost half of all workplaces employ fewer than four people. The largest employer in Hernals is a chocolate factory Manner, which employs more than 500 people.

== Sister district ==
The sister district of Hernals is Fuchū. The cherry trees in Lidlpark are a gift from the sister district. Classes from the gymnasium (school) Geblergasse visit the district.

== Sports ==
Wiener Sport-Club's traditional home is in the Dornbach quarter; it is one of the country's oldest athletics clubs. They play at the Sportklub Stadium.

== Famous people ==
The most notable artists of Hernals are the composers Johann and Josef Schrammel, the actors Josef Meinrad and Ewald Balser, the poet Ferdinand Sauter, the writer Frederic Morton, the church musician Josef Venantius von Wöss, the operetta composer Edmund Eysler, and actress Marianne Schönauer. Furthermore, the architect Friedrich von Schmidt, figure skater Ferdinand Sauter, the entrepreneur Josef Manner also lived in Hernals. Also the poet and translator Hans Werner Sokop lives in Hernals.

=== Other dwellers ===
- Placidus Böcken
- Eduard Engelmann Jr.
- Conrad Haas, born here
- Wilhelm Karl Ritter von Haidinger
- Julius Klinger, born here
