= Extremschrammeln =

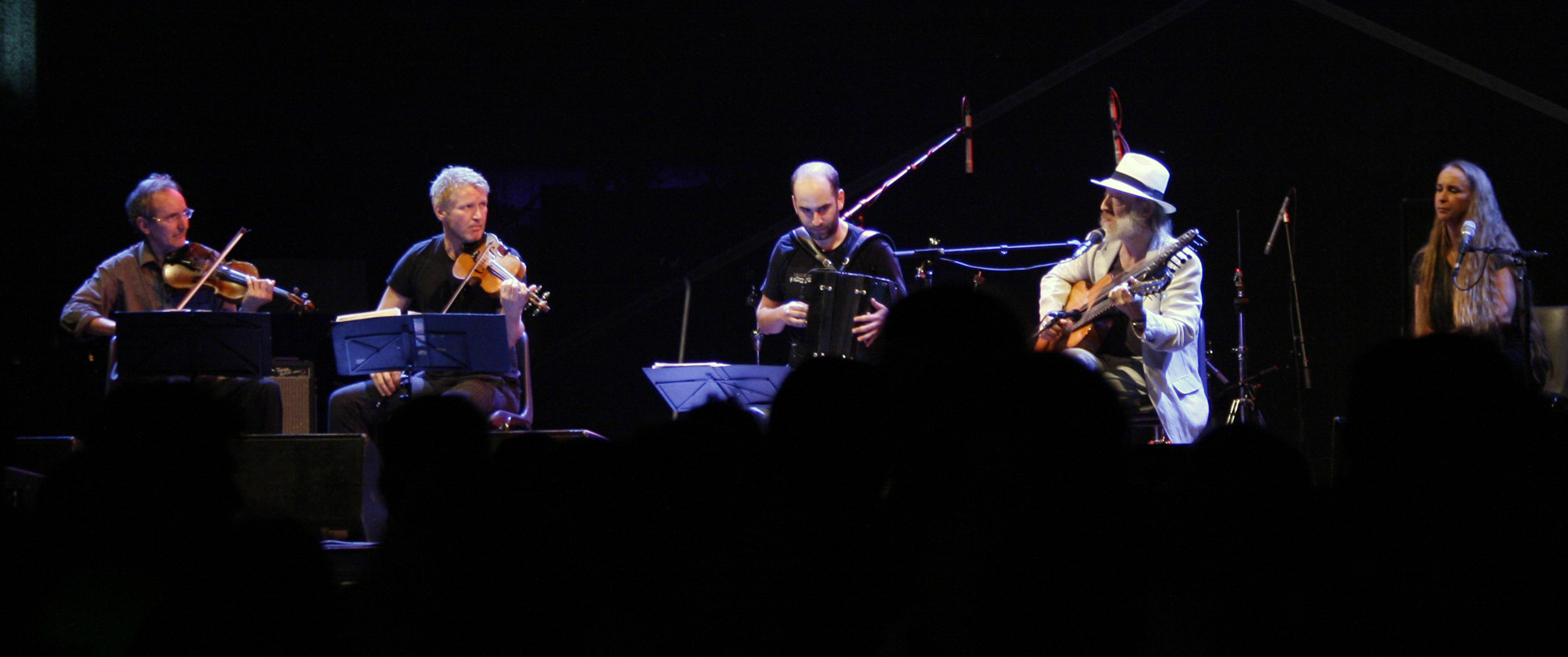
Extremschrammeln, Vienna 2008)

Extremschrammeln are an Austrian folk music band, led by guitarist and singer Roland Neuwirth. The group enhance the traditional Viennese folk music Schrammelmusik with satirical lyrics, as well as jazz, blues, rock, and 20th-century classical music influences. They perform original songs in German, Viennese, and English.

Big hits include "Der Weg Ist Weit Nach Floridsdorf" ("It's a Long Way to Floridsdorf") and "Fantastisch Elastisch" ("Fantastic Elastic").

The band is on the Warner Music label.

== Discography ==
- Nachtschicht: 2002, Warner Music
- Geschrammelte Werke (2 CDs): 1999, Warner Music
- Nr.9 Die Pathologische: 1998, Warner Music
- I hab an Karl mit mir: 1996, Warner Music
- herzTON.Schrammeln.: 1996, BMG Arioola
- Moment, der Christbaum brennt: 1995, Warner Music
- Essig & Öl: 1994, Warner Music
- Waß da Teufel (2 CDs): 1989, Warner Music
- Guat drauf: 1988, Warner Music
- Extrem: 1983, Alpha Music
- Alles is hin: 1980, EMI Columbia
- 10 Wienerlieder und 1 Fußpilz-Blues: 1978, Preiser Records

== See also ==
- Wienerlied
