= Contraguitar =

Type of guitar

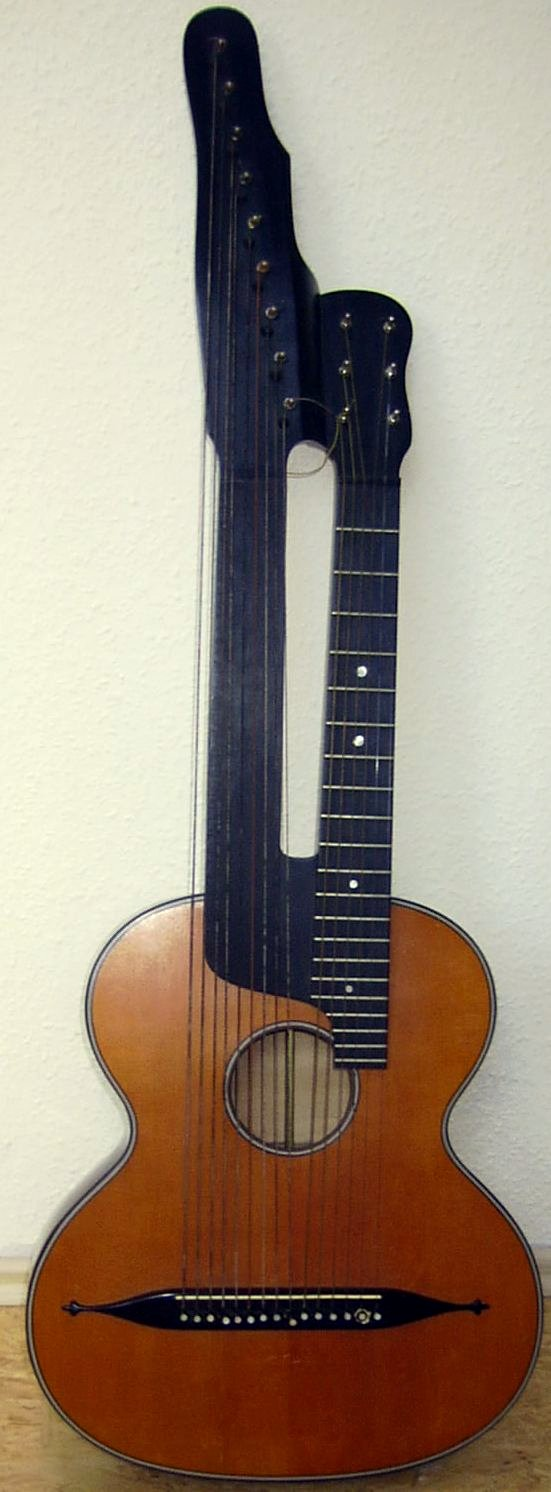
A Viennese "Schrammel guitar."

The contraguitar or Schrammel guitar is a type of guitar developed in Vienna in the mid-19th century. In addition to the usual guitar neck with six strings and a fretboard, it has a second, fretless neck with up to nine bass strings. Customarily these additional strings are tuned from E-flat downwards. The lowest string on the 15-string contraguitar is usually tuned to G.

Viennese instrument maker Johann Gottfried Scherzer developed the instrument after 1848, improving on earlier, unfinished efforts by Johann Georg Stauffer (1778–1853), the master from whom Scherzer had learned his craft.

The contraguitar is heard almost exclusively in Viennese folk music, especially Schrammelmusik. Occasionally it is also used in Alpine folk music.

== Bibliography ==
- "Die Kontragitarre in Wien" (diploma thesis) by Reinhard Kopschar
- Stauffer & Co.: The Viennese guitar of the 19th Century (book & CD) by Erik Pierre Hofmann, Pascal Mougin, and Stefan Hackl. ISBN 9782953886801

== See also ==
- Acoustic guitar
- Combolin
- Harp guitar
- Multi-neck guitar
- Schrammelmusik
