= Schrammelmusik =

Style of Viennese folk music

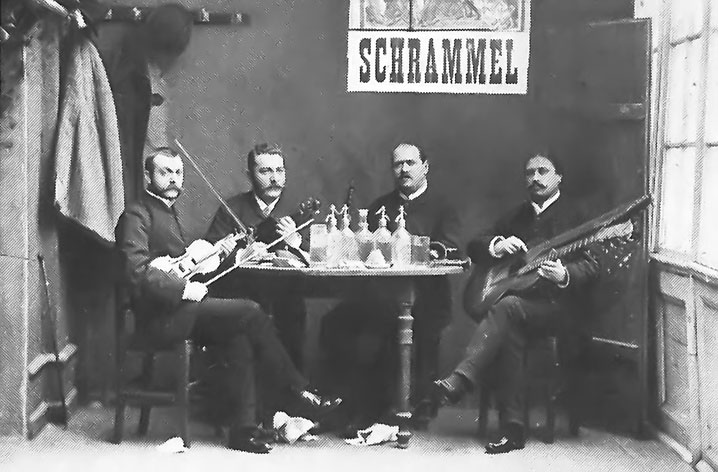
The Schrammel quartet in 1890

Schrammelmusik (German pronunciation: [ˈʃʁaməlmuˌzik]) is a style of Viennese folk music originating in the late nineteenth century and still performed in Austria. The style is named for the prolific folk composers Johann and Josef Schrammel.

== The Schrammel brothers ==
In 1878, the brothers Johann Schrammel (1850–1893) and Josef Schrammel (1852-1895), musicians, violinists and composers from Vienna, Austria, formed an ensemble with guitarist Anton Strohmayer, son of the composer Alois Strohmayer. The Schrammel brothers played two violins, accompanied by Strohmayer on a double-necked contraguitar. Inspired by both urbane and rustic traditions, the three musicians performed folk songs, marches, and dance music, most often for audiences at wine taverns (Heurigen) and inns around Vienna. At first the trio called themselves the "Nussdorfers" after the village of Nussdorf where they often performed.

In 1884 clarinetist Georg Dänzer joined the group, which soon enjoyed success under the name "Schrammel Brothers Specialities Quartet" (Specialitäten Quartett Gebrüder Schrammel). The ensemble was invited to perform in palaces and mansions as "Schrammel euphoria" gripped the Viennese elite. So great was the Schrammel brothers' popularity that some earlier folk music forms, such as the Wienerlied dialect song, came to be known as Schrammelmusik as well. The Schrammels' popularity eventually extended throughout Europe and in 1893 they were invited to perform at the World's Columbian Exposition in Chicago.

The Schrammels composed more than 200 songs and music pieces in just seven years. Johann Schrammel died in 1893, followed two years later by Josef. Each brother was 43 years old at his death, and both died of nephritis.

== Style ==
A typical Schrammelmusik ensemble consists of two violins or fiddles, a double-necked contraguitar, and a G clarinet (also known in Austria as a picksüßes Hölzl). Often a button accordion, called a Schrammelharmonika, is included.

Performers strive for a melancholy, "crying", but melodious sound. The style is influenced by folk music from Austria, Hungary, Slovenia, Moravia and Bavaria.

Several of Vienna's composers of formal music have also been Schrammelmusik enthusiasts, including Johann Strauss, Johannes Brahms, and Arnold Schönberg.

== Modern performers ==
Modern performers of Schrammelmusik include Extremschrammeln, Edi Reiser, Karl Hodina, Roland Neuwirth, Wiener Thalia Quartett, Malat Schrammeln, Alfons Bauer, Rudi Knabl, Anton Karas, and Peter Havlicek.

== Recordings ==
- The album Continental Cafe contains five tracks of Schrammelmusik, by a group called Wiener Konzertschrammeln. The record was issued by Cook Records in the 1950s and reissued by Smithsonian Folkways in 2004.

== Literature ==
- Schrammelwelt-Schrammelmusik by Kurt Dieman.
