= Josef Schrammel =

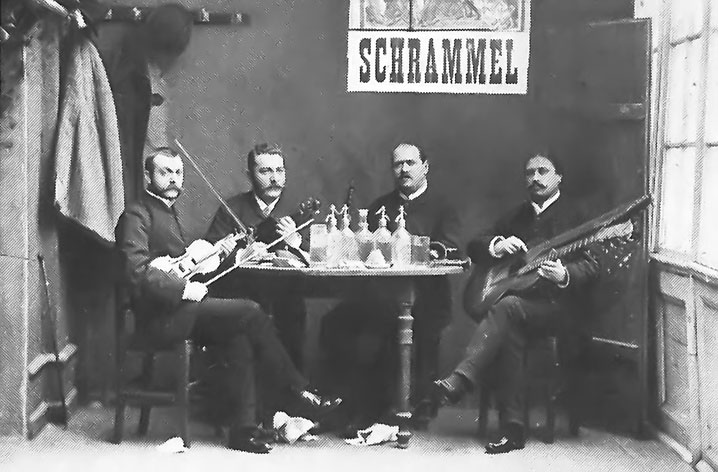
Josef Schrammel; shown on the far right with the Schrammel Quartet

Josef Schrammel (3 March 1852 – 24 November 1895) was a composer and musician from Austria-Hungary.

He was an illegitimate son of Kasper Schrammel and his later wife Alosia Ernst. Very early in his life, his father recognised the talent of Josef and sent him, despite financial hardship, to the Conservatory of the Gesellschaft der Musikfreunde (Society of Friends of Music in Vienna) where he received violin lessons. Later in his life, he travelled to the Orient. In 1878 Josef founded, along with his brother Johann Schrammel and a guitarist, a trio; the following year Anton Strohmayer replaced the first guitarist. This eventually, with the addition of clarinetist Georg Dänzer, became the famous Schrammel Quartet.

His grave is located in Hernals in Vienna.

== Literature ==
- Margarethe Egger: Die „Schrammeln“ in ihrer Zeit. Heyne, München 2000, ISBN 3-453-16336-2.
- Stefan Winterstein (Hrsg.): Josef Schrammel im Serail. Die Aufzeichnungen des Wiener Volksmusikers über seine Reise in den Vorderen Orient 1869–1871. Schneider, Tutzing 2007, ISBN 978-3-7952-1223-0, (Schriftenreihe zur Musik 11).
- Rudolf Alexander Moißl: Die Schrammel-Dynastie. St. Pöltner Zeitungs-Verlags-Gesellschaft, St. Pölten 1943.
- Alois Böck, Walter Deutsch: Das Werk der Brüder Schrammel. Einführung und Verzeichnis. Schneider, Tutzing 1993, ISBN 3-7952-0763-0, (Schriftenreihe zur Musik 9).
- F. Mailer – H. Reitterer: "Schrammel Joseph". In: Österreichisches Biographisches Lexikon 1815–1950 (ÖBL). Vol. 11, Austrian Academy of Sciences, Vienna 1999, ISBN 3-7001-2803-7, p. 171–173. (Direct links to "p. 171", "p. 172", "p. 173")
- Ernst Weber (2007). "Schrammel". Neue Deutsche Biographie (in German). Vol. 23. Berlin: Duncker & Humblot. pp. 517–518. (full text online).
