= List of Stradivarius instruments =

This is a list of Stradivarius string instruments made by members of the house of Antonio Stradivari.

== Stradivarius instruments ==
=== Violins ===
This list has 282 entries.

==== Early period: 1666–1699 ====
Sobriquet	Year	Provenance	Notes
Alumnas Amati, Ashby, Silvestre, Serdet	1666	Sasakawa Music Foundation	Possibly the earliest known violin by Stradivari. The instrument was last sold by J & A Beare. One of a few instruments that has a connection between Stradivarius and Nicola Amati, with whom Stradivarius may have worked as an apprentice. The violin includes the label Alumnus Nicolais Amati.
ex-Sachs	c. 1666	Madame Sachs	Historically important and one of the earliest known violins by Stradivari. In 2008 for sale by Poesis Fine Instruments.
ex Back	c. 1666	Fridart Foundation	The violin shows influence from Amati and the model is based on Amati's violins, but the narrow purfling differs from Amati's style.
	c. 1666		The violin was owned by Eugene Sarbu.
Aranyi	1667	Francis Aranyi (collector)	Sold at Sotheby's London, 12 November 1986.
Dubois	1667	Canimex Inc.	On display at the Chimei Museum.
ex-Captain Saville	1667	Jean-Baptiste Vuillaume; Captain Saville (1901–1907)	Currently on loan to André Rieu.
Ex Jenkins, Jenkins-Thompson	1667		Sold at Sotheby's in 1995.
Piet – Beare-Biddulph	1667		Owned by Charles Beare & Peter until 1990 and sold at Machold Rare Violins in 2001.
Amatese	1668		Though listed in many reference books as one of Stradivari's earliest instruments, the modern consensus is that it is not a Stradivarius; it was sold at Sotheby's New York on 3 February 1982 as "an interesting violin".
Canadian	1668		Sold at Kenneth Warren & Son in Chicago (1991).
Golden Bell	ca.1668		Played by Simone Zgraggen.
Clisbee, Francalucci	1669	Mrs. Clisbee	On exhibition at Museo del Violino, Cremona, Italy, since 2003.
Hill	1669		
Oistrakh	1671	Queen Elisabeth of Belgium; Glinka Museum, Moscow	Previously owned by David Oistrakh, who inherited it in 1969 under the will of Queen Elisabeth. He never performed with this instrument, constructed in the Nicola Amati style, because of the short scale, uncomfortable for his hand. Oistrakh's widow presented the violin to the Glinka Museum. It was stolen in May 1996, but recovered in 2001.
Sellière	1672	Charles IV of Spain	
Spanish; ex-Faltin	1678	Finnish Cultural Foundation	On loan to Elina Vähälä. In 2011 it was revealed that the instrument was actually made by Girolamo Amati.
Hellier	1679	Sir Samuel Hellier	Smithsonian Institution
Paganini-Desaint	1680	Sasakawa Music Foundation	This violin, and the Paganini-Conte Cozio di Salabue violin of 1727, the Paganini-Mendelssohn viola 1731 and the Paganini-Ladenburg cello of 1736, comprise the Paganini Quartet; the foundation owns more than a dozen Stradivari instruments. On loan to Florian Schötz of the Goldmund Quartet.
	1680	The collection of Mr & Mrs Rin Kei Mei.	
	1681	Reynier and Count de Lachenais	Presumably presented by Napoleon III to the French violinist Léon Reynier, who sold it to Count de Lachenais of Marseilles in 1881. By the intermediary of Albert Caressa, it became part of the collection of John Wanamaker in 1924, when it was acquired by the Rudolph Wurlitzer Co. in 1929. Its last known owner was Miles Franklin Yount. Reynier also owned a 1727 violin (see below).
Fleming	1681		
Bucher	1683		On loan to Alma Deutscher since 2019. The loan is administered by the Tarisio Trust.
Derpinina	1683		
Cipriani Potter	1683	Cipriani Potter	
Cobbett; ex-Holloway	1683		On loan to Sejong Soloists, New York City, brokered by the Stradivari Society.
ex-Croall	1684	WestLB	
ex-Elphinstone	1684		Owned since 2005 by Philip Greenberg, artistic director and conductor of the Kyiv Philharmonic in Ukraine.
The Marquis	1685	Marchese Spinola; Mark Kaplan	
ex-Arma Senkrah	1685	The Ruggeri – Stiftung	On loan to Bogdan Bozovic.
ex-Castelbarco	1685		
Eugenie, ex-Mackenzie	1685	anonymous	On loan to Swang Lin, associate concertmaster, Fort Worth Symphony Orchestra.
ex-Nachez	1686	Dr. Winfred and Mr. John Constable.	
Rosenheim	1686	William Rosenheim.	
Goddard	1686	Miss Goddard; Antonio Fortunato.	
Ex Bello, Marie Law	1687	c. 1875: from George Parsons to Hart & Son (London); c. 1900: John Lawson (Liverpool); c. 1910: Anonymous, lent to Marie Law; 1921: Robert A. Bower (Somerset, UK); 1924: Rudolph Wurlitzer Company (Cincinnati, Ohio); 1927: J. Mariano Bello (Mexico); 1997: Anonymous; 2012: Italian collector from Rare Violins New York auction	On loan to Maristella Patuzzi. The Stradivari was used to record the Decca album Intimamente Tango (2015, No. 481 1489) and a new Violin concerto by Manuel De Sica published by Brilliant Classics (2014, No. 94905).
Ole Bull	1687	Ole Bull (1844); Herbert Axelrod (1985–1997)	Donated to the Smithsonian Institution in 1997 by Herbert R. Axelrod; now part of the Axelrod quartet.
Mercur-Avery	1687		On loan to Jonathan Carney, concertmaster of the Baltimore Symphony Orchestra since 2002.
	1688	The collection of Mr & Mrs Rin Kei Mei.	
Baumgartner	1689	Canada Council for the Arts	On loan to Alice Lee.
Arditi	1689	Dextra musica AS, Norway	On loan to Elise Båtnes, concertmaster of the Oslo Philharmonic.
Spanish I	1689?	Patrimonio Nacional, Palacio Real, Madrid, Spain.	Part of a duo of violins (Spanish I and II) referred to as los Decorados and los Palatinos; also collectively known as del Cuarteto Real (The Royal Quartet) when included with the Spanish Court viola (1696) and cello (1694).
Spanish II	1689?	Patrimonio Nacional, Palacio Real, Madrid, Spain.	Part of a duo of violins (Spanish I and II) referred to as los Decorados and los Palatinos; also collectively known as del Cuarteto Real (The Royal Quartet) when included with the Spanish Court viola (1696) and cello (1694).
Ex-Leopold Auer	1690	Leopold Auer	On loan to Vadim Gluzman brokered by the Stradivari Society.
Bingham	1690		
Theodor	1690		Named after its first known owner.
Boissier-Sarasate	1690	Real Conservatorio Superior de Música de Madrid	Named after its owner, this violin is one of two Stradivarius instruments which previously belonged to Navarrese musician Pablo de Sarasate.
Ex-Ries	1691	Reinhold Würth Music Foundation	On loan to József Lendvay Jr. since 2008. Since October 2020 on loan to German violinist Veronika Eberle
Czar of Russia, Albrecht, Avery Fisher	1692	Juilliard School	Purchased by Avery Fisher in 1976. Donated to Juilliard School in 1991.
Guttmann	1692	Juilliard School	
Bennett	1692	Winterthur-Versicherungen	On loan to Hanna Weinmeister.
Falmouth	1692	Gert-Jan Kramer.	On loan to Alexander Kerr, concertmaster, Dallas Symphony Orchestra.
Queux de Saint-Hilaire	c.1692	Musée de la Musique, Paris	Long-pattern (longuet). Donated in 1890. On display at the museum.
Gould	1693	Charles Dancla; Emil Młynarski; Albert Caressa firm; George Gould; Metropolitan Museum of Art	Bequeathed by Gould to the Metropolitan Museum in 1955.
Harrison	1693	Richard Harrison; Henry Hottinger; Kyung-wha Chung	In the collection of the National Music Museum in Vermillion, South Dakota.
Baillot–Pommerau	1694	Pierre Baillot	Formerly owned by Arthur Catterall, then by Alfredo Campoli.
ex-Halíř or Strad Halir 1694	1694	Karel Halíř; Philip Greenberg, Artistic director and conductor of the Kyiv Philharmonic, Ukraine; Dr. Harold Dinkens; Robert Schumitzky, Associate Concertmaster at Opera Pacific Orchestra and first violin at Orchestra Nova San Diego and Pacific Symphony.	Karel Halíř premiered with this instrument the new version of Sibelius's Violin Concerto on 19 October 1905, with Richard Strauss conducting the Berlin Court Orchestra.
Francesca	1694	Metropolitan Museum of Art	Bequest of Nanna Matthews Bryant, 1933.
Rutson	1694	Royal Academy of Music	Played by Clio Gould.
Fetzer	1695		Played by Angela Bae of the Balourdet Quartet
Lincoln	1695		Bequeathed to the people of Lincoln in 1970 by Mrs. Dudley Pelham on condition that it be loaned to the Hallé Orchestra for the use of their leader.
ex-Kym	1696		Owned by Korean-born classical musician, Min-Jin Kym. Stolen at Euston Station in London in 2010, but recovered in 2013 and auctioned for £1.38M to English violinist Andrew Bernardi.
Haddock, Cator, Rostal	1697	Sampson Moore (? – 1890); George Haddock (1890); Jan Kubelík; Stellings (1898–1906); 1906 – 1927 Diana Cator; W. E. Hill & Sons (1927–1943); Major S. V. Shea-Simonds (1943 – ?); Max Rostal (1947 – ?); Henry Werro (? – 1968); Helga Hussels (1968–1988); Gothenburg Symphony Orchestra (1992 – )	
Paganini	1697	Niccolò Paganini	Dima Bilan, together with Evgeni Plushenko and Edvin Marton playing his Stradivarius, won the Eurovision Song Contest 2008.
Molitor	1697	Madame Juliette Récamier, Paris (?–1804); Count Gabriel Jean Joseph Molitor, Paris (1804–1849); Molitor family (1849–1917); J. Mazeran, Paris (1917–1923); The Curtis Institute, Philadelphia (1929–1936); R. A. Bower, Somerset (1937–1957); Muriel Anderson, Londonderry (1957–1989); Elmar Oliveira (1989–1994); Albert Stern (1994–2010); Anne Akiko Meyers (2010–)	Thought to previously belong to Napoleon Bonaparte. Sold by Tarisio Auctions for $3,600,000, a new world record, until the Lady Blunt was sold on 20 June 2011.
Cecilia C A (Capitulum Agriense)	1697	Owned by Zelnik István Southeast Asian Gold Museum from 2011, and loaned to Katalin Kokas for five years.	Johann Ladislaus Pyrker, 1827; an unknown Protestant or Jewish religious identity, 1945; Aranymúzeum, 2011
Cabriac	1698		
Baron Knoop	1698		One of eleven Stradivari violins associated with Baron Johann Knoop.
Joachim-Kortschak-Field	1698	Owned by Joseph Joachim 1886–1898, Hugo Kortschak 1925 and Joan Field 1958–1968.	
Duc de Camposelice	1699	Cho-Liang Lin	
Lady Tennant; Lafont	1699	Charles Phillipe Lafont; Marguerite Agaranthe Tennant	On loan to Xiang Gao brokered by the Stradivari Society; sold at Christie's auction US$2.032 million, April 2005.
Countess Polignac	1699		On loan to Gil Shaham.
Castelbarco	1699	United States Library of Congress	Presented by Gertrude Clarke Whittall.
Kustendyke	1699	Royal Academy of Music	
Crespi	1699	Fridart Foundation Dr David Li AM	On loan to Christian Li through the J & A Beare's International Violin Society.
ex-Berglund	1699	Finnish Cultural Foundation (Suomen Kulttuurirahasto)	Previously owned by conductor Paavo Berglund. Purchased from Berglund's estate by the Finnish Cultural Foundation in June 2012. On loan to Antti Tikkanen.
ex-Beatrice Mulgan	1699	Victoria and Albert Museum	Bequeathed by Beatrice Mulgan to the Victoria and Albert Museum in 1937.

==== Golden period: 1700–1718 ====
Sobriquet	Year	Provenance	Notes
Berger	1700	Charles Auguste de Bériot; Henri Vieuxtemps; Guillaume Brochon; Jean Salis; Isador Berger; Ralph P. Powell	Currently in possession of Bein & Fushi Violins.
ex-Berglund	1699	Finnish Cultural Foundation (Suomen Kulttuurirahasto)	Previously owned by conductor Paavo Berglund. Purchased from Berglund's estate by the Finnish Cultural Foundation in June 2012. On loan to Antti Tikkanen.
The Penny	1700	Barbara Penny	
Petri	1700	Henri Petri	
Dragonetti	1700	Music Foundation	Formerly owned by Alfredo Campoli, now played by Veronika Eberle.
Jupiter	1700	Giovanni Battista Viotti	Owned and played since 1964 by Arnold Belnick, Los Angeles, California.
Russian, Margaret, Berson	1700		
Taft; ex-Emil Heermann	1700	Canada Council for the Arts	On loan to Nikki Chooi who was from 2009 to 2012 the recipient of the Council's 1729 Guarneri, now on loan to Chooi's younger brother Timothy Chooi.
Taylor, Heberlein	1700	San Francisco Symphony	Owned by the San Francisco Symphony since 2002.
Ward	1700	United States Library of Congress	Presented by Gertrude Clarke Whittall.
Circle, Nachez	1701		
Court Strad	1701		
Deveault	1701	Guy and Maryse Deveault	On loan to Alexandre Da Costa
Dushkin, Sandler	1701	Samuel Dushkin, Albert Sandler	On loan to Dennis Kim, concertmaster, Pacific Symphony.
Ferraresi	1701	Herbert R. Axelrod, New Jersey Symphony	Sold at Ingles & Hayday in 2016.
Kreutzer, von Hautem	1701	Rodolphe Kreutzer, Uto Ughi	
Markees	1701	Shozo Nakajima	
Brodsky	1702	Adolf Brodsky (Warsaw); Hamma & Co. (Stuttgart); E. Bernhard (Ravel), 1930; Harry Wahl (Viborg, Finland), 1930–40; Emil Herrmann, 1947; Alexander Schneider, 1947–56; Isidore Cohen, 1956–2005; Anonymous, 2006	Named after Adolph Brodsky who premiered Tchaikovsky's Violin Concerto on this violin on 4 December 1881. On loan to Kirill Troussov since 2006. Previously played by Adolf Brodsky, Alexander Schneider and Isidore Cohen.
Irish	1702	Pohjola Bank Art Foundation, Finland	On loan to Rebecca Roozeman.
Campoli	1702	Alfredo Campoli (1959–1961)	Sold by W. E. Hill & Sons in 1961.
Conte de Fontana; ex-Oistrakh	1702	Pro Canale Foundation	Loaned to Pavel Berman. Previously owned by David Oistrakh (1959–1966). After the 1736 Yusupov it was his second Strad, bought in Paris in 1959 and traded in 1966 for the 1705 Marsick.
De La Taille	1702	Rafael Druian (1948–1961)	
Lukens; Edler; Voicu	1702	A. W. Lukens Charles Edler; Ion Voicu; Romania Culture Ministry	On loan to Alexandru Tomescu until 2023.
Lord Borwick	1702	Lord Borwick; Janos Szanto, 1945; Dr Eugenio Sturchio; Dr. Marcus Ossre; Dorothy B. Cooper, 1963	On loan to Ririko Takagi.
King Maximilian Joseph	1702	Maximilian Joseph III of Bavaria, 1745–77; King Maximilian Joseph of Bavaria, 1799–1825; King Ludwig II of Bavaria, 1864; Franz Rampftler (Munich), 1886; von Knörzinger and his family, 1920–23; Hug & Co., 1923; Hamma & Co. (Stuttgart); Marc E. Maartens (Kew Gardens); Victor Mannheimer, 1925–28; Mannheimer family, 1928–61; Rembert Wurlitzer Inc., 1961; Irving Levick (Buffalo), 1961–98; Anonymous Stradivari Society Patron; Anonymous group of investors, 2007	Lifetime loan to Berent Korfker.
Lyall	1702	Formerly owned by University of Western Ontario	Players of the violin include Stefan Milenkovich and Lara St. John.
Lord Newlands	1702	Sasakawa Music Foundation	On loan to Suyoen Kim.
Wondra Bey	1702		
	1703	George Schlieps, Herbert R. Axelrod (1987–2003), New Jersey Symphony Orchestra (2003–2007)	
Antonio Stradivari	1703	Bundesrepublik Deutschland	Exhibited at Musikinstrumentenmuseum, Berlin.
La Rouse Boughton	1703	Oesterreichische Nationalbank	On loan to Boris Kuschnir of the Kopelman Quartet.
Allegretti	1703		
Alsager	1703		Previously sold by W. E. Hill & Sons, Hamma & Co. and Henry Werro.
Aurora, ex-Foulis	1703		On loan to Karen Gomyo.
Cobbett, Dickson-Poynder	1703	Walter Willson Cobbett	Certificate by W. E. Hill & Sons notes that violin is from 1703, even though label says 1715. Sold by Sotheby's in 1972.
Emiliani	1703	Ludwig Strauss, violinist Eva Mudocci, violinist, harpist Charlene Dilling Brewer, Anne-Sophie Mutter (since 1979)	
Ford	1703	Sir William Curtis, Elias Breeskin, Henry Ford	Since 2003, at the Henry Ford Museum.
Lady Harmsworth	1703	Paul Bartel	On loan to Kristóf Baráti by arrangement with the Stradivarius Society of Chicago.
de Rougemont, Gordon, Hart	1703	Luigi Tarisio, violinist Godfrey Ludlow, Henry Ford	
Rynberger, Prince Friedrich Wilhelm of Prussia	1703	Prince Friedrich Wilhelm of Prussia	On exhibit at the Henry Ford Museum.
Schoofs, Vidoudez, Huber, Steiner-Schweitzer	1703	Mischa Elman	Sold by Bongartz's in 1998.
Betts	1704	United States Library of Congress	Presented by Gertrude Clarke Whittall.
ex-Liebig	1704	Baron Liebig; Wolfgang Schneiderhan; Rony Rogoff	Owned by Baron Liebig from 1911; Owned by Wolfgang Schneiderhan from 1952 to 1991; Owned by Rony Rogoff (1991–2004) Currently owned by Dkfm Angelika Prokopp Privatstiftung, on loan to Julian Rachlin.
Glennie	1704	John Edward Betts (19th century)	Sold at W. E. Hill & Sons in 1953.
Prince Obolensky	1704		On loan to Esther Yoo.
Sleeping Beauty	1704	L-Bank	On loan to Isabelle Faust. One of the few Stradivari violins to have retained its original neck.
Viotti	1704	Giovanni Battista Viotti (late 18th century to early 19th century)	Part of the Monetsugu Collectio in Tokyo, Japan (since c. 2010).
Baron von der Leyen	1705	Private owner	Auctioned by Tarisio on 26 April 2012 for $2.6 million.
ex-Marsick; ex-Oistrakh	1705	David Fulton	Previously owned by David Oistrakh (1966–1974), acquired in trade for the 1702 Conte di Fontana. Currently on loan to James Ehnes.
ex-Tadolini	1706	The collection of Mr & Mrs Rin Kei Mei.	
Charles Castleman, ex-Marquis de Champeaux	1707	c.1876 David Laurie, Glasgow; 1881 Princesse de Podenas, Paris through Gand & Bernardel Frères, Paris; 1892 Jean-Jacques Mathias, Paris through Gand & Bernardel Frères, Paris; 1918 Max Rosen, New York through Rudolph Wurlitzer, New York; 1929 George P. Orr, Philadelphia, PA through William Moennig & Son; 1979 Sotheby's auction, New York; 1983 Charles Castleman, New York through Jacques Français	On loan to Miclen LaiPang by the Queen Elisabeth Music Chapel
ex-Brüstlein	1707	Oesterreichische Nationalbank	On loan to Yamen Saadi
La Cathédrale	1707	Nigel Kennedy	
ex-Prihoda	1707	Luz Leskowitz	Previously owned by Czech violinist Váša Příhoda, teacher of Luz Leskowitz.
Hammer	1707	Christian Hammer (collector)	Sold at Christie's New York on 16 May 2006 for a record US$3,544,000 (€2,765,080) after five minutes of bidding.
	1707	Russian State Collection, Glinka State Central Museum of Musical Culture, Moscow.	
Rivaz, Baron Gutmann	1707	J & A Beare Dextra Musica since 2016	Formerly on loan to Janine Jansen. On loan to Eldbjørg Hemsing
Davidoff	1708	Musée de la Musique, Paris	Bequeathed to the museum in 1887.
Tua	1708	Musée de la Musique, Paris	Donated to the museum in 1935.
Burstein; Bagshawe	1708		Owned by the Jacobs family, loaned to Jeff Thayer, San Diego Symphony concertmaster.
Huggins	1708	Sasakawa Music Foundation	On loan to the most recent winner of the Queen Elisabeth Competition for violin, currently Stella Chen winner of the 2019 edition.
Empress Caterina	1708		Loaned to Brett Yang and Eddy Chen of TwoSet Violin in 2022.
Regent, Superb	1708	Owned by the Fridart Foundation.	Loaned to Brett Yang and Eddy Chen of TwoSet Violin in 2022.
Ruby	1708		On loan to Chen Xi brokered by the Stradivari Society.
Strauss	1708		On loan to Clara-Jumi Kang brokered by the Stradivari Society.
Greffuhle	1709		Donated to the Smithsonian Institution in 1997 by Herbert R. Axelrod. Now part of the Axelrod quartet.
Berlin Hochschule	1709		
ex-Hämmerle; ex-Adler	1709	Oesterreichische Nationalbank	On loan to Rainer Honeck.
Ernst	1709	Heinrich Wilhelm Ernst, circa 1850–1865; Wilma Neruda, 1872	On loan to Dénes Zsigmondy through 2003.
Engleman	1709	Sasakawa Music Foundation.	On loan to Bora Kim. Previously loaned to Timothy Chooi, and Benjamin Beilman
King Maximilian; Unico	1709	Axel Springer Foundation	On loan to Michel Schwalbé, concertmaster of the Berlin Philharmonic (1966–1986); reported stolen in 1999.
Viotti; ex-Bruce	1709	Royal Academy of Music	Allocated to the Royal Academy of Music after acquisition by HM Government in July 2005 in lieu of inheritance tax, with additional funding from the National Heritage Memorial Fund, National Art Collections Fund, J & A Beare, The Belmont Trust, Nigel Brown, members of the Bruce family, Albert Frost CBE, Elizabeth Insall, Ian Stoutzker OBE, Old Possum's Practical Trust, BBC Two's The Culture Show and anonymous donors.
ex-Nachéz	1709	Tivadar Nachéz (until 1900); Kurt Vogel (1900–1929); Emil Herrmann (1929–1930); Albert Sommer (from 1930)	Previously played by Elisabetta Garetti. Now played by Roman Simovic, Leader of the London Symphony Orchestra, courtesy of Jonathan Moulds, chair of the LSO Advisory Council.
Marie Hall	1709	Giovanni Battista Viotti; Chimei Museum	Named after violinist Marie Hall.
ex-Scotta	1709		On loan to Pekka Kuusisto.
La Pucelle	1709	Huguette Clark; David L. Fulton	Parisian dealer Jean Baptiste Vuillaume took it apart in the 19th century and added a tailpiece with a carving of Joan of Arc, the virgin warrior known as La Pucelle.
Camposelice	1710	Sasakawa Music Foundation	It was on loan to Svetlin Roussev. Since 2023 it has been loaned to María Dueñas.
Lord Dunn–Raven	1710	Anne-Sophie Mutter	
ex-Roederer	1710		On loan to David Grimal. (Owned by Ayla Erduran for 37 years).
ex-Vieuxtemps	1710	Purchased 1900 by Leopold Geissmar, a lawyer and amateur musician in Mannheim. His daughter Berta had it in 1944.	Not to be confused with the Vieuxtemps-Hauser violin on loan to Samuel Magad, concertmaster 1972–2007, Chicago Symphony Orchestra.
Dancla Stradivarius (1703)	1703	Linus Roth	The Dancla is now owned by the Landesbank Baden-Württemberg and on loan to renowned German violinist Linus Roth.
Dancla Stradivarius (1708)	1708		In 1913 luthiers of Caressa & Français wrote a letter stating that the violin was "fully authentic, totally guaranteed and in a remarkable state of conservation"
Dancla Stradivarius (1710)	1710	Toshiya Eto	The violin is sometimes classified as the "Dancla Milstein" because it was owned and used in performances by American virtuoso violinist Nathan Milstein.
Davis	1710	Mr. and Mrs. William S. Davis	On loan to Michael Shih, concertmaster, Fort Worth Symphony Orchestra.
ex-Kittel	1710	Russian State Collection, Glinka Museum, Moscow.	
The Antonius	1711	Metropolitan Museum of Art	Bequest of Annie Bolton Matthews Bryant, 1933.
the Lady Inchiquin	1711	Previously owned by Fritz Kreisler.	Played by Frank Peter Zimmermann, a German banking company WestLB AG bought it for his use.
Earl of Plymouth; Kreisler	1711	Los Angeles Philharmonic	Found in a storeroom on the estate of the Earl of Plymouth in 1925; purchased by Fritz Kreisler in 1928 and subsequently sold by him in 1946.
Liegnitz	1711		Previously owned by Szymon Goldberg.
Viotti	1712	Giovanni Battista Viotti; Henry Hottinger Collection	Owned since 1965 by Isaac Hurwitz.
Le Fountaine	1712		This is a 'Violino piccolo' from 1712 – slightly shorter than a regular violin, measuring 475mm from top to bottom, 100mm shorter than a regular instrument.
Le Brun	1712	Niccolò Paganini; Charles Lebrun; Boutillier Family; Until 1893 Chardon et Fils; From 1893 Vincenzo Sighicelli; From 1922 Otto Senn; From 2008 Anonymous concert violinist	Sold at Sotheby's auction on 13 November 2001. From November 2015 to January 2016 was on loan to Kiril Laskarov, concertmaster of the Arkansas Symphony Orchestra.
Karpilowsky	1712	Harry Solloway	Missing: stolen in 1953 from Solloway's residence in Los Feliz.
Dubois	1713	Canimex, Inc	On loan to Nikki Chooi since 2023
Schreiber	1713		
Antonio Stradivari	1713		
Boissier-Sarasate	1713	Real Conservatorio Superior de Música de Madrid	Sarasate legancy 1909
Daniel	1713		On loan to Juan Pablo Reynoso
Sancy	1713	Ivry Gitlis	
Gibson	1713	Bronisław Huberman; Norbert Brainin; Joshua Bell	Stolen twice from Huberman.
Lady Ley	1713	Stradivarius family	Owned by Jue Yao, Chinese violinist.
Wirth	1713	Nicolo Mori; John Hart; Louis d'Egville; Jan de Graan; Emmanuel Wirth; Max Adler & family; David Montagu; Sergiu Luca; Chimei Museum	
Dolphin; Delfino	1714	Jascha Heifetz; Sasakawa Music Foundation	On loan to Timothy Chooi and previously loaned to Ray Chen. Named the "Dolphin" in the 19th century by George Hart, because the back of the violin, with its shape and its shimmering colour, reminded him of a dolphin.
Soil	1714	Amédée Soil; Yehudi Menuhin; Itzhak Perlman	
ex-Berou; ex-Thibaud	1714	Jacques Thibaud	Previously owned by David Oistrakh (his first Stradivarius, bought in the US in 1956).
Le Maurien	1714		Missing: stolen 2002.
Leonora Jackson	1714	Leonora Jackson, William Sloan Collection	
Massart	1714	Lambert Massart; György Pauk	
Joachim–Ma	1714	Joseph Joachim, Si-hon Ma, New England Conservatory of Music	Bequeathed to the New England Conservatory by Ma in 2009, it was sold at auction for $11.3 million in February 2025 to fund a new scholarship.
Sinsheimer; General Kyd; Perlman	1714	Itzhak Perlman; David L. Fulton	Formerly loaned to Nadja Salerno-Sonnenberg
Smith-Quersin	1714	Oesterreichische Nationalbank	On loan to Rainer Honeck, the Vienna Philharmonic leader.
Alard-Baron Knoop	1715	Juan Luis Prieto	Named for French violinist Jean-Delphin Alard. Sold at auction in 1981 to a collector in Singapore for $1.2 million.
Baron Knoop; ex-Bevan	1715		Ex Fulton, sold in March 2025 to an anonymous buyer for $23 million
ex-Bazzini	1715		On loan to Matteo Fedeli.
Cremonese; ex-Harold; Joseph Joachim	1715	Joseph Joachim; Municipality of Cremona	On exhibition at Museo del Violino, Cremona, Italy.
Emperor	1715	George Haddock (1876–1907); Edgar Haddock (1907–1910); Jan Kubelík	Sold to Jan Kubelík in 1910 for £10,000.
Duke of Cambridge; ex-Pierre Rode	1715	Pierre Rode; Leopold Auer; Oscar Shumsky; NPO "Yellow Angel"	Janine Jansen (since Sept 2020 – courtesy of a European benefactor)
Joachim	1715	Sasakawa Music Foundation	the ’Joachim-Aranyi’ is so named as it once belonged to Joseph Joachim, who bequeathed it to his great-niece Adela d’Aranyi. It was loaned to Angelo Xiang Yu in 2019. The foundation announced its loan to Japanese violinist Risa Hokamura, Silver medalist of the 2018 International Violin Competition of Indianapolis, in 2023.
Lipiński	1715	Giuseppe Tartini	On loan to Milwaukee Symphony Orchestra concertmaster, Frank Almond. Stolen in an armed robbery on 27 January 2014 and subsequently recovered.
Marsick	1715	James Ehnes	
Titian	1715	Cho-Liang Lin	Previously owned by Efrem Zimbalist. Purchased by Felix M. Warburg circa 1926 as part of a quartet set for the Institute of Musical Art's Musical Art Quartet, played by Sascha Jacobsen.
Ex Adolf Busch	1716		Owned by David Garrett since 2010.
Berthier	1716	Baron Vecsey de Vecse; Fondazione Pro Canale	On loan to Anna Tifu, on loan to Giovanni Andrea Zanon
Booth	1716	Sasakawa Music Foundation	On loan to Arabella Steinbacher; formerly loaned to Shunsuke Sato; formerly loaned to Julia Fischer.
Cessole	1716		
Cherubini	1716	Galleria dell'Accademia	On exhibition at the Galeria dell'Accademia (Gallery of the Academy of Florence) in Florence, Italy
Colossus	1716	Luigi Alberto Bianchi	Missing; stolen in Rome, Italy, in November 1998.
Duranti	1716	On loan to Mariko Senju since 2002.	
Milstein ex Goldman	1716	Nathan Milstein	Sold by Charles Beare and the Milstein Family to Jerry Kohl.
Monasterio	1716	Ruggiero Ricci	Named after violinist and composer Jesús de Monasterio. Cyrus Forough.
Provigny	1716	Musée de la Musique, Paris	Bequeathed to the Museum in 1909.
Messiah-Salabue	1716	Ashmolean Museum Oxford	On exhibition at the Oxford Ashmolean Museum; made from the same tree as a P.G. Rogeri violin of 1710. It is considered to be the only remaining Stradivarius violin in as new state.
ex-Windsor-Weinstein; Fite	1716	Canada Council for the Arts	On loan to Timothy Chooi.
Baron Wittgenstein	1716	Bulgarian Ministry of Culture	Formerly owned by John Corigliano Sr. (former concertmaster of the New York Philharmonic). On loan to Mincho Minchev 1977–2024. Now loaned to Svetlin Roussev till 2029.
Gariel	1717	Luigi Tarisio sold the ‘Gariel’ Stradivarius to another famous violin dealer, Jean-Baptiste Vuillaume, who in turn sold it to the eminent French engineer, physician and founder member of the Academy of Science in Paris, Charles-Marie Gariel, the instrument's namesake. Gariel likely sold it on shortly before his death in 1924. Jaime Laredo	Owned by Jonathan Moulds, Chair of the LSO Advisory Council. On long-term loan to Nicola Benedetti.
ex-Wieniawski	1717	Henryk Wieniawski	
ex-Baumgartner	1717	Rudolf Baumgartner, Lucerne Festival Strings	On loan to Daniel Dodds.
Toenniges	1717	Strad with the Vuillaume Back; Lawrence Welk; Dick Kesner	Dick Kesner; Paul Toenniges (Studio City, California)
Kochanski	1717	Pierre Amoyal; Paweł Kochański	Stolen in 1987; recovered in 1991.
Sasserno	1717	Sasakawa Music Foundation.	Loaned to Viviane Hagner until 2012. Loaned to Alina Pogostkina. On loan to Ji Young Lim
Maurin	1718	Royal Academy of Music, London, Rutson Bequest	
Viotti; ex-Rosé	1718	Giovanni Battista Viotti; Oesterreichische Nationalbank	On loan to Volkhard Steude
Chanot-Chardon	1718	Timothy Baker; Joshua Bell	Shaped like a guitar; on loan to Simone Lamsma.
Firebird; ex-Saint Exupéry	1718	Salvatore Accardo	Named for the colouration of the varnish, and for the instrument's brilliant sound.
Marquis de Rivière	1718	Daniel Majeske	Played by Majeske while concertmaster of the Cleveland Orchestra from 1969 to 1993.
San Lorenzo	1718	Georg Talbot	
ex-Count Vieri	1718	The collection of Mr & Mrs Rin Kei Mei.	
ex-Prové	1718		Played by Ilya Gringolts
Lauterbach	1719	Johann Christoph Lauterbach; J.B. Vuillaume; Charles Philippe Lafont	
Zahn	1719	LVMH	
Wieniawski–Bower	1719	Henryk Wieniawski, Benz Mercedes Zurich	Loan to Klaidi Sahatci, Tonhalle Orchester Zurich Concertmaster.
Malakh	1719	Dr. L. Looby	Malakh House. Last played 1946.
Woolhouse	1720	Played by Rudolf Koelman.	
ex-Bavarian	1720	Metropolitan Museum of Art	
Madrileño	1720	Rimma Sushanskaya; Teacher of Harvard; Wife of Benjamin Franklin; Rembert Wurlitzer; Duques de Osuna; Ruggiero Ricci	
von Beckerath	1720	Michael Antonello	
ex-Thibaud	1720	Jacques Thibaud	Destroyed in the crash of Air France Flight 178 on 1 September 1953.
Sinsheimer; Iselin	1721		Stolen in Hanover, Germany in 2008; recovered in 2009.
Lady Blunt	1721	Nippon Music Foundation.	Named for Lady Anne Blunt, daughter of Ada Lovelace (and granddaughter of Lord Byron). The Lady Blunt was last sold at London auction house Tarisio on 20 June 2011 for £9,808,000 (US$15.9 million), with proceeds going to the Nippon Foundation's Northeastern Japan Earthquake and Tsunami Relief Fund.
Jean-Marie Leclair	1721	Jean-Marie Leclair	On loan to Guido Rimonda.
Red Mendelssohn	1720	Joseph Joachim; Mendelssohn family; Elizabeth Pitcairn	Inspiration for the 1998 film, The Red Violin Formerly part of the von Mendelssohn family quartet of Stradivaris in Berlin.
Birsou	1721	Léon Reynier; Joan Field; Vy Thanh Dat	Formerly owned by Metropolitan Museum of Art. Joan Field, an American violinist (1915–1988) also known as one of its owners, played the Birsou from 1921 to 1929. In 2002, Joshua Bell recorded O'mio Babbino Caro on the Birsou.
The MacMillan	1721	Tossy Spivakovsky	Loaned to Ray Chen through Young Concert Artists from 2008 to 2012; on loan to Ning Feng through Premiere Performances of Hong Kong (2012–present).
Artot	1722	Lorin Maazel	
Jules Falk	1723	Viktoria Mullova	Bought by the American violinist Jules Falk in 1907. A child prodigy, Falk joined the Philadelphia Orchestra under Stokowski aged 17 and was later music director of the Steel Pier in Atlantic City. He played this Stradivarius violin until his death in 1957.
Jupiter; ex-Goding	1722	Sasakawa Music Foundation	On loan to Ryu Goto; formerly to Midori Goto, Daishin Kashimoto, and Manrico Padovani.
Laub–Petschnikoff	1722		
Elman	1722	Chimei Museum	On loan to William Wei
Cádiz	1722	Joseph Fuchs	On loan to Jennifer Frautschi; named after the city of Cádiz, Spain.
Rode	1722		Currently used by Erzhan Kulibaev by courtesy of the Maggini Foundation.
ex-Vallot	1722	Edwin Sherrard; Oberlin Conservatory of Music (1989).	2015 restored by John K. Becker of Chicago.
Kiesewetter	1723	Christophe Kiesewetter; Clement and Karen Arrison.	On loan to Philippe Quint brokered by the Stradivari Society. Left by Quint in taxi on 21 April 2008 and recovered the following day. Since 2010, on loan to Augustin Hadelich, through the Stradivari Society of Chicago.
Earl Spencer	1723		On loan to Nicola Benedetti.
Sarasate	1724	Ignazio Alessandro Cozio di Salabue; Niccolò Paganini (1817–1840); Jean-Baptiste Vuillaume; Pablo de Sarasate; Musée de la Musique, Paris since 1909.	Owned by Cozio di Salabue, it was sold to Niccolò Paganini in 1817, at his death in 1840 by his son to Jean-Baptiste Vuillaume, then to Pablo de Sarasate who bequeathed it in 1909 to the Conservatoire de Musique in memory of his student days. On display at the museum.
Ex-Szigeti, Ludwig	1724	Bears the inscription: "Antonius Stradivarius Cremonensis faciebat Anno 1724". Since 1989 in the possession of the Landesbank Baden-Württemberg and is awarded to musicians to use.	
ex-Kavakos, Abergavenny	1724		Leonidas Kavakos played it from 2010 to 2017.
Brancaccio	1725	Destroyed in an allied air raid on Berlin.	Owned by Carl Flesch until 1928; sold to Franz von Mendelssohn, banker and amateur violinist.
Chaconne	1725	Oesterreichische Nationalbank	On loan to Rainer Küchel.
Leonardo da Vinci	1725	Da Vinci family.	
Lubbock	1725	Jean-Jacques Grasset (17??–1839); Charles Francois Gand (Paris) (1839–1844); Meugy (1844–1892); W.E. Hill & Sons (1892–1893); Neville Lubbock & Miss Lubbock (1893–1917); Destreicher (1917–1925); W.E. Hill & Sons (1925–1928); Rudolph Wurlitzer Co. (1925–1928); Caroline Powers Thomas (Scarsdale NY) (1928–1960s)	Owned by French artist/musician Jean-Jacques Grasset until his death in 1839, owned and played by amateur musician Meugy and later owned and played by Miss Lubbock establishing its sobriquet as Lubbock.
Wilhelmj	1725	Sasakawa Music Foundation	On loan to Baiba Skride; one of several Stradivari violins with the sobriquet "Wilhelmj".

==== Late period: 1726–1737 ====
Sobriquet	Year	Provenance	Notes
Hubay	1726	Niccolò Paganini (until 1840); Baron Achille Paganini (1840); Jean-Baptiste Vuillaume (until 1870); François van Hal (from 1870); Jenő Hubay (1889–1900); Eugen Fischer de Farkasházy (1900–1928); Caressa (1928–); Albert Caressa (1954–)	Played by Paganini, Hubay, Nai-Yuan Hu, Robert Gerle, Daniel Stabrawa. Currently played by Edvin Marton.
Greville; Kreisler; Adams	1726	Fritz Kreisler	
Baron Deurbroucq	1727	Baron Deurbroucq (The Hague) (1870); Robert Crawford (Edinburgh); W.E. Hill & Sons (1902); Hans Wessely (1903–1926); David D. Walton (Boston) (1926); Emil Herrmann (19??–1945); Fredell Lack (1945–2014); Beare's International Violin Society (2015–present)	Formerly played by Janine Jansen
Barrere	1727		Formerly on loan to Janine Jansen, now on loan to Rosanne Philippens.
Benvenuti	1727		Owned by Maurice Hasson.
Davidoff-Morini	1727	Owned by violinist Erica Morini, purchased for her by her father in Paris in 1924 for $10,000	Missing: stolen in 1995.
ex-General Dupont	1727	Arthur Grumiaux	On loan to Frank Peter Zimmermann.
Holroyd	1727		Owned by Koh Gabriel Kameda.
Kreutzer	1727	Rodolphe Kreutzer, Maxim Vengerov	One of four Stradivari violins with the sobriquet Kreutzer (1701, 1720, 1731).
ex-Reynier or Le Reynier; Hart; ex-Francescatti	1727	LVMH since 1993 or 1994; Salvatore Accardo	Named after Léon Reynier who won at the Concervatoire de Paris in 1847. On loan to Augustin Dumay. Previously played by Kirill Troussov (1997–2006) and Maxim Vengerov, who now owns and plays the Stradivarius Kreutzer.
Paganini-Conte Cozio di Salabue	1727	Sasakawa Music Foundation	This violin, and the Paganini-Desaint violin of 1680, the Paganini-Mendelssohn viola of 1731 and the Paganini-Ladenburg cello of 1736, comprise the Paganini Quartet. On loan to Pinchas Adt of the Goldmund Quartet.
Halphen	1727	Angelika Prokopp Private Foundation	On loan to Eckhard Seifert.
Vesuvius	1727	Antonio Brosa; Remo Lauricella; Town of Cremona	On exhibition at Museo del Violino, Cremona, Italy.
	1727	Suntory Foundation for Arts	On loan to Shion Minami.
A. J. Fletcher; Red Cross Knight	1728	A. J. Fletcher Foundation	On loan to Nicholas Kitchen of the Borromeo String Quartet; the instrument was made by Omobono Stradivarius.
	1728	Australian Chamber Orchestra Instrument Fund	On loan to Satu Vänskä, Assistant Leader of the orchestra.
Artot–Alard	1728	Endre Balogh	A copy of this instrument was produced in 1996 by Gregg Alf and Joseph Curtin, using modern materials and methods; Balogh performs on both the 1728 original and the replica.
Artôt-Godowsky	1728	Alexandre Artôt; Leopold Godowsky; Leopold Godowsky Jr.; Juilliard School (1959–present)	Named after first owner Alexandre Artôt.
Dragonetti-Milanollo	1728	Giovanni Battista Viotti; Domenico Dragonetti; Teresa Milanollo; Christian Ferras; Pierre Amoyal	On loan to Corey Cerovsek.
Perkins	1728	Los Angeles Philharmonic	Named for Frederick Perkins; formerly owned by Luigi Boccherini.
Benny	1729	Jack Benny; Los Angeles Philharmonic	Bequeathed to the Los Angeles Philharmonic by Jack Benny.
Solomon, ex-Lambert	1729	Murray Lambert; Seymour Solomon	Sold at Christie's, New York for US$2,728,000 (€2,040,000).
Innes	1729		On loan to Eugen Sârbu; previously loaned to Henryk Wieniawski.
Libon	1729	Felipe Libon; Josef Suk	
Guarneri	1729	Canada Council for the Arts	On loan to Timothy Chooi, the younger brother of the 2009–2012 loan recipient Nikki Chooi, in 2012 named recipient of the Council's 1700 Taft Stradivari
Récamier	1729	Ueno Fine Chemicals Industry, Ltd.	On loan to Sayaka Shoji.
Baldiani	1730	Countess Baldiani; Suzanne Chaigneau; Fridolin Hamma; Dr. Wolfgang Kuhn	Sold for $338,500 at Christie's, New York, in October 2008.
Accademia	1730	Seattle Symphony Orchestra - Tarisio - Accademia Concertante - owner unknown	Played by young talented musicians of Accademia Concertante d'Archi di Milano (Italy) - Information: Antonio Stradivari: The complete works - Beares publishing - V vol
Ex-Neveu	1730	Marcel Vatelot	Produced by Omobono Stradivari. Purchased by Ginette Neveu in 1935 to enter the Wieniawski Competition. Was lost in a 1949 aircraft crash in the Azores along with Neveu.
Royal Spanish	1730	Anne Akiko Meyers	Once owned by the King of Spain.
Tritton	1730	Kolja Blacher	
Lady Jeanne	1731	Donald Kahn Foundation	On loan to Benjamin Schmid.
Kreutzer	1731	Rodolphe Kreutzer, Huguette M. Clark	One of four Stradivari violins with the sobriquet Kreutzer (1701, 1720, 1727). Failed to sell at Christie's in New York on 18 June 2014.
Garcin	1731	Jules Garcin; Israel Baker; Sidney Harth	
Heifetz-Piel	1731	Rudolph Piel; Jascha Heifetz	
?	1731	Pierre Gerber; Hansheinz Schneeberger	Hansheinz Schneeberger, owner since 1959.
Baillot	1732	Pierre Baillot, Fondazione Cassa di Risparmio	Lent to Giuliano Carmignola for the DG recording of Vivaldi: Concertos for Two Violins.
Duke of Alcantara	1732	An obscure Spanish nobleman UCLA	Genevieve Vedder donated the instrument to UCLA's music department in the 1960s. In 1967, the instrument was on loan to David Margetts. Whether it was left on the roof of his car or stolen is uncertain, but for 27 years the violin was considered missing until it was recovered from an amateur violinist who claimed to have found it on a freeway. A settlement was made and the Stradivarius was returned to UCLA in 1995.
Red Diamond	1732	Louis Von Spencer IV	
Tom Taylor	1732		Previously owned by Joshua Bell.
	1732		Currently for sale at Peter Prier & Sons Violins in Salt Lake City, Utah.
Arkwright Lady Rebecca Sylvan	1732	Carlo Alfredo Piatti; John Hungerford Arkwright; Joseph Sylvan; Rachel Barton Pine Foundation	Donated to the foundation by Sylvan in 2015.
ex-Dollfus	1732		Played by Helena Rathbone on loan from anonymous Australian benefactors
Des Rosiers	1733	Angèle Dubeau	Previously owned by Arthur Leblanc
Huberman; Kreisler	1733	Bronisław Huberman; Fritz Kreisler	
Khevenhüller	1733	Johann, 2nd Prince of Khevenhüller-Metsch, Yehudi Menuhin	
Rode	1733		Currently used by Vadim Repin
Ames	1734	Roman Totenberg	Stolen in May 1980, found June 2015, returned to Totenberg family on 6 August 2015. As of October 2018, it has been sold to an unknown author.
Scotland University	1734	Sau-Wing Lam Collection	Currently used by Sergei Krylov by courtesy of the Fondazione Antonio Stradivari in Cremona.
Baron Feilitzsch; Heermann	1734	Baron Feilitzsch; Hugo Heerman; Gidon Kremer	
Habeneck	1734	Royal Academy of Music	
Herkules; Ysaÿe; ex-Szeryng; also Kinor David	1734	Eugène Ysaÿe; Charles Münch; Henryk Szeryng; State of Israel	Stolen from Ysaÿe during a concert in St. Petersburg in 1908; he had left it in the dressing room unattended. It reappeared at a shop in Paris in 1925. In 1972 Szeryng donated the instrument as Kinor David (David's fiddle) to the City of Jerusalem. According to his wish, the violin is to be played by the concertmaster of the Israel Philharmonic Orchestra.
Willemotte	1734		Maria Lidka;acquired by Leonidas Kavakos in 2017.
Lord Amherst of Hackney	1734	Fritz Kreisler	
Lamoureux; ex-Zimbalist	1735		Missing: stolen.
Samazeuilh	1735	Sasakawa Music Foundation	On loan to Ray Chen.
Muntz	1736	Sasakawa Music Foundation	On loan to Yuki Manuela Janke, concertmaster of the Staatskapelle Dresden.
ex-Roussy	1736	Chisako Takashima.	
Yale Stradivari	1736	Yale University, Collection of Musical Instruments.	
Spiritus Sorsana	1736	David Montagu	
Yusupov	1736	House of Yusupov, Russian State Collection, Glinka Museum, Moscow.	Previously loaned to David Oistrakh (1930s–1941)
Comte d'Amaille	1737		
Lord Norton	1737		

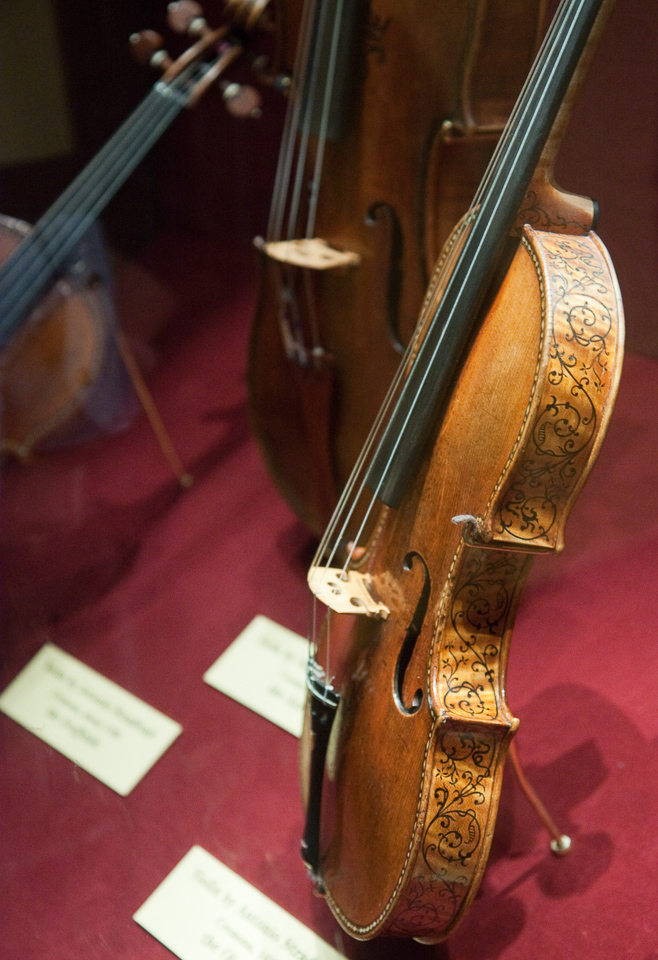
Detail of Ole Bull Stradivarius violin (1687)

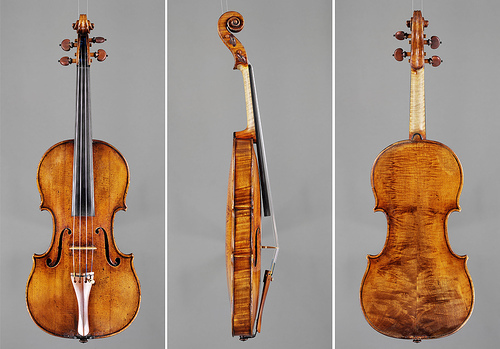
The Hubay Stradivarius violin (1726)

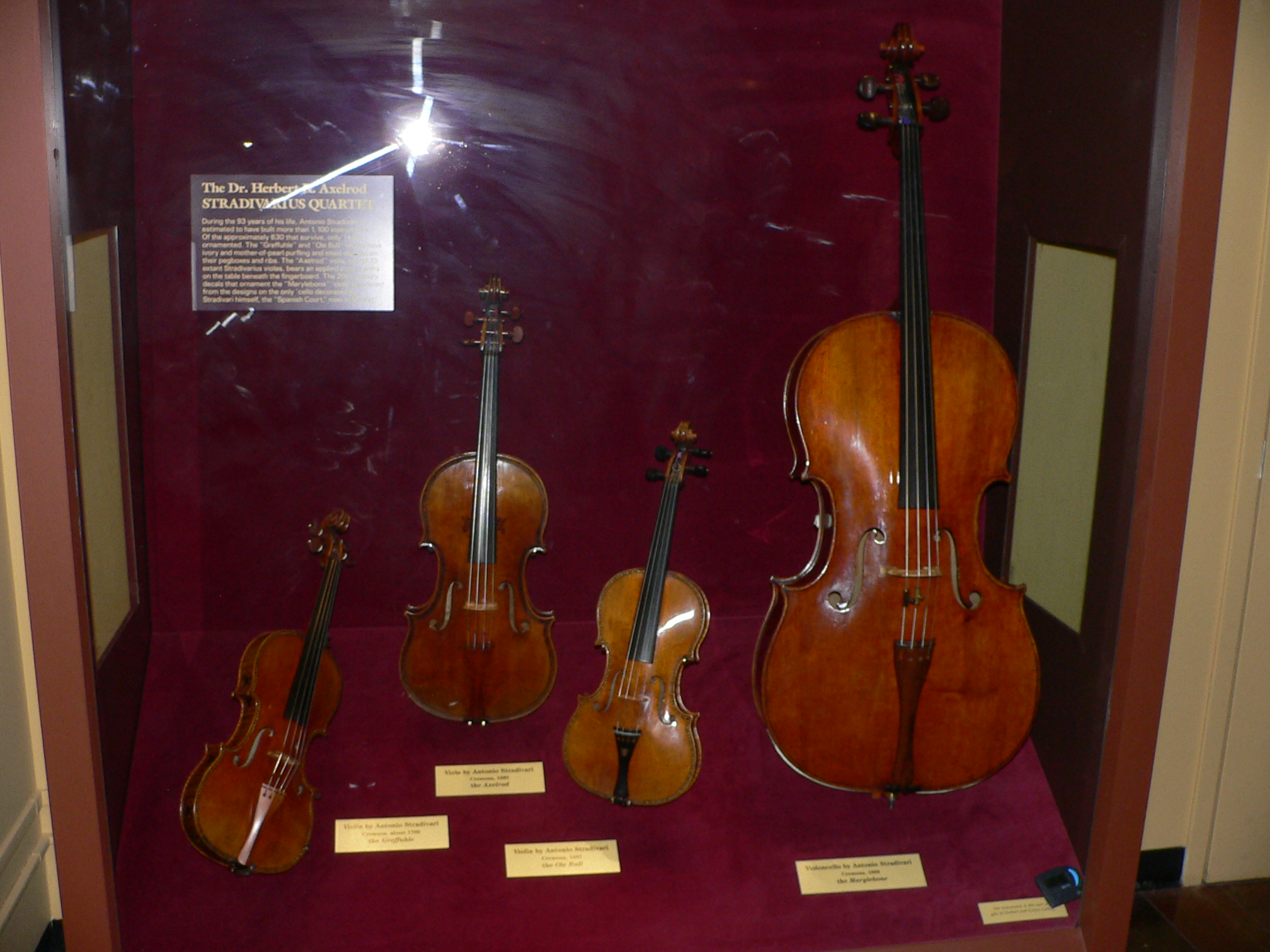
The Axelrod quartet of Stradivarius instruments, on display in the Smithsonian Institution National Museum of American History. From left to right: Greffuhle violin (1709), Axelrod viola (1696), Ole Bull violin (1687), and Marylebone cello (1688).
Stradivarius violins at the Metropolitan Museum of Art
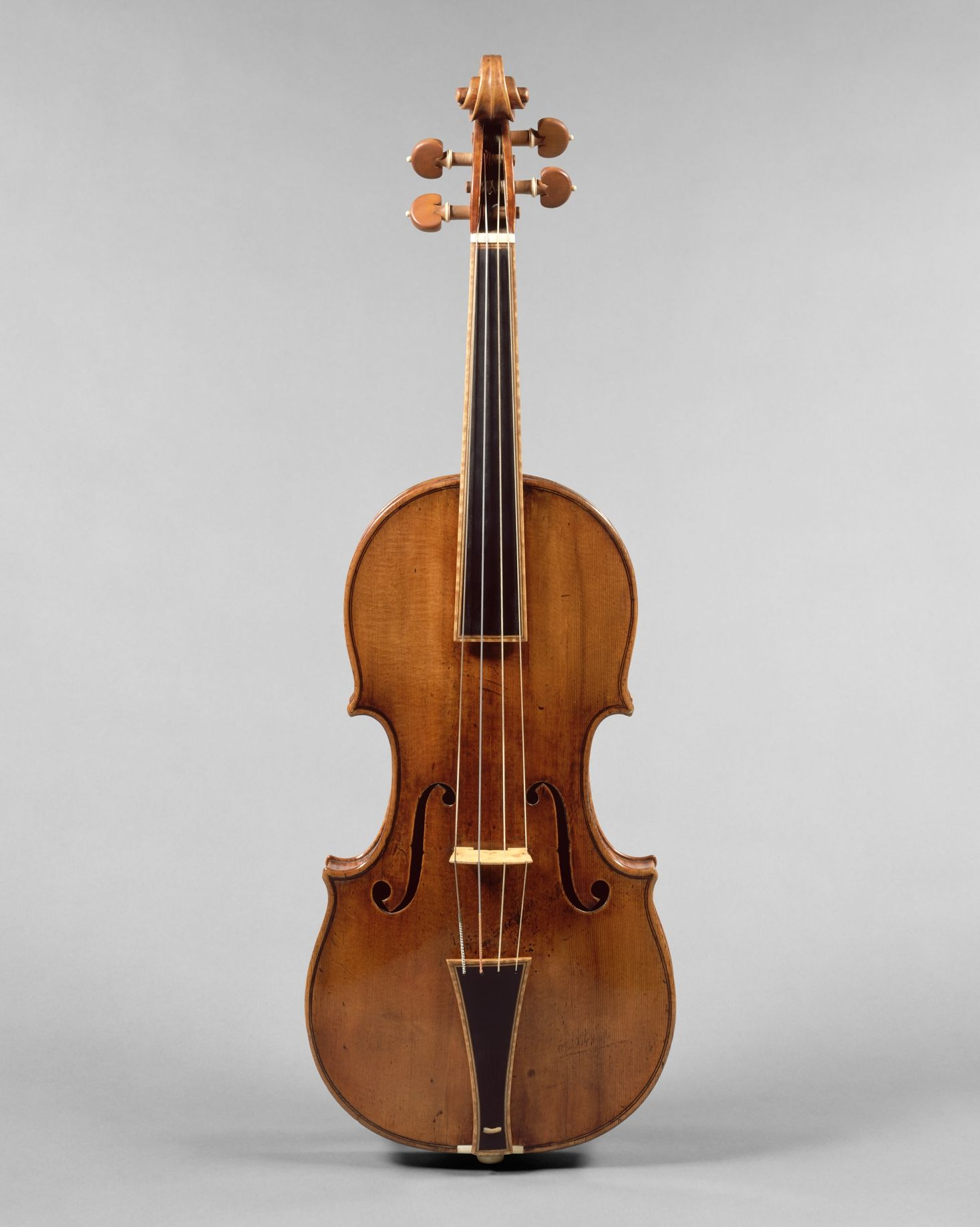
The Gould (1693)

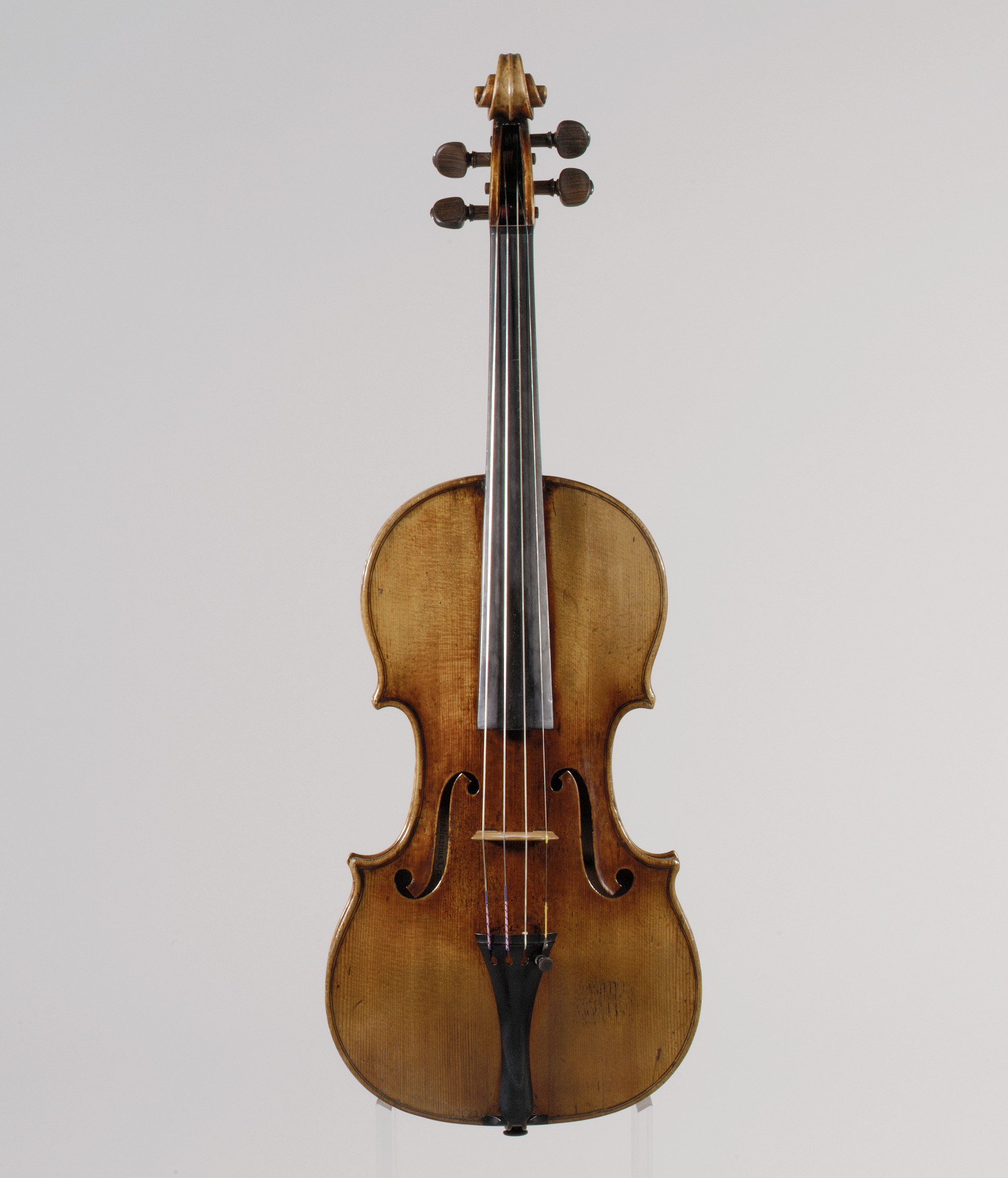
The Antonius (1711)

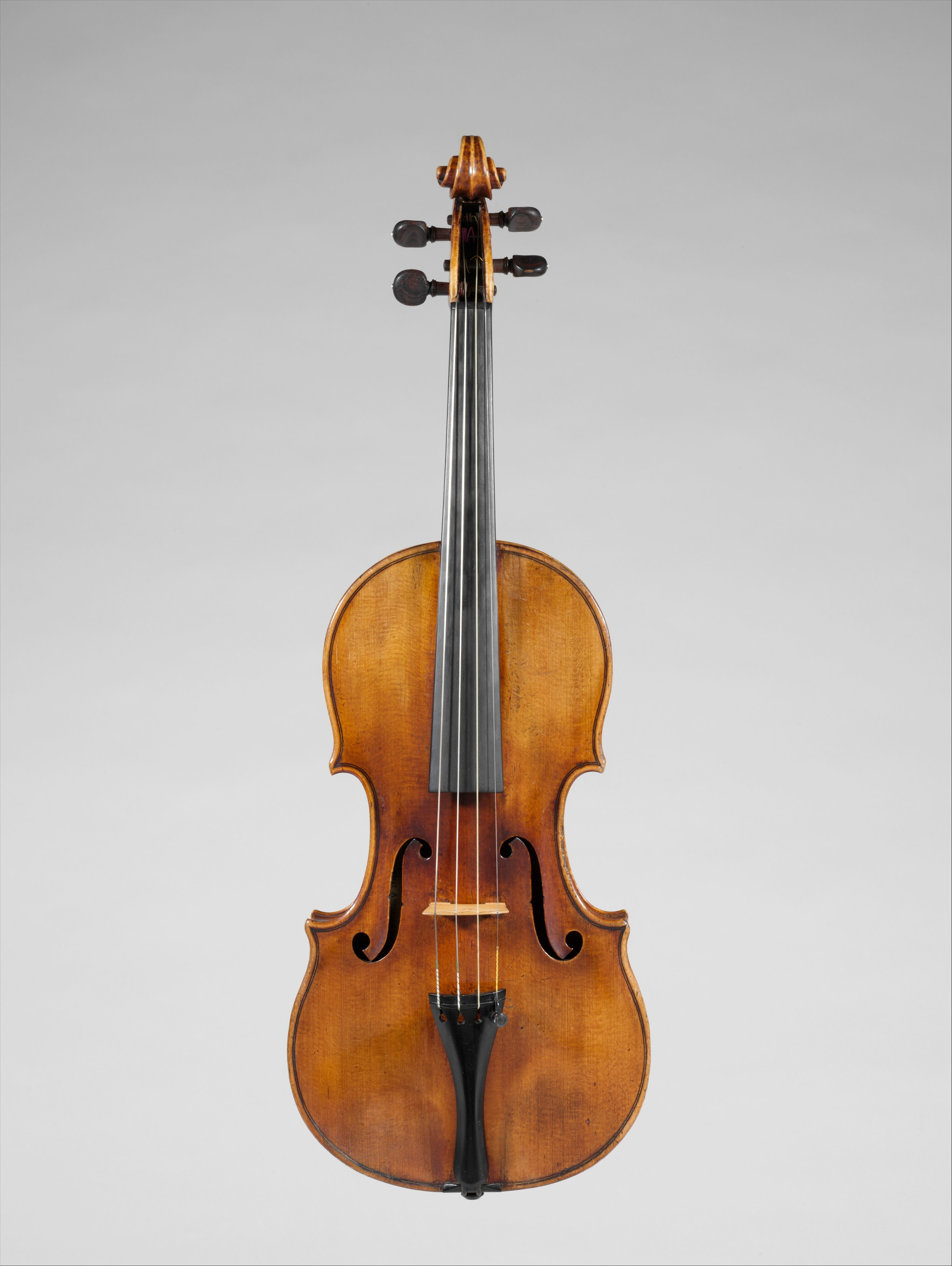
The Francesca (1694)

=== Violas ===
There are twelve known extant Stradivari violas.

Sobriquet	Year	Provenance	Notes
Mahler	1672	Habisreutinger Foundation	The first of the Stradivarius violas; currently on loan to French violist Antoine Tamestit.
Tuscan-Medici Tenor	1690	Ferdinando de' Medici, Grand Prince of Tuscany Conservatorio Luigi Cherubini Galleria dell'Accademia Florence, Italy	On exhibition Part of the Medici Quartet
Tuscan-Medici	1690	Ferdinando de' Medici, Grand Prince of Tuscany Herbert N. Straus Cameron Baird Library of Congress	Commissioned by Ferdinando I de' Medici, Grand Duke of Tuscany. Part of the Medici Quartet
Axelrod	1695		Donated to the Smithsonian Institution in 1997 by Herbert R. Axelrod. Now part of the Axelrod quartet.
Archinto	1696	Royal Academy of Music.	For elegance and grandeur, and in view of its remarkable state of preservation, the "Archinto" of 1696 is arguably the best example known.
Spanish Court	1696	Patrimonio Nacional, Palacio Real, Madrid, Spain.	Collectively known as el Cuarteto Real (The Royal Quartet) when included with the violin duo los Decorados (Spanish I and II) and the Spanish Court cello of 1694.
MacDonald	1719	Baron Johann Knoop; Felix M. Warburg; Peter Schidlof	Purchased as part of a quartet of Stradivari for $200,000 by banker Felix M. Warburg in the 1920s. The quartet was frequently loaned to the Musical Art Quartet for performances, where it was played by Louis Kaufman. Was to be sold at auction through London musical instruments auction house Ingles & Hayday in conjunction with Sotheby's in Spring 2014 via silent auction. Winning bid was to be announced on 25 June 2014, but the instrument failed to attract a buyer matching the minimum bid of $45 million. In late 2025 the Macdonald was sold to the Stretton Society, a philanthropic nonprofit organization based in Berlin, for "the highest purchase price ever for a stringed instrument", quantified only as significantly higher than $23 million.
Lux; Castelbarco	1714	Fridart Foundation	Converted from viol to viola by Jean Baptiste Vuillaume.
The Russian	1715	Russian State Collection	
Cassavetti	1727	United States Library of Congress	Presented by Gertrude Clarke Whittall.
Paganini-Mendelssohn	1731	Sasakawa Music Foundation	This viola, and the Paganini-Desaint violin of 1680, the Paganini-Conte Cozio di Salabue violin of 1727 and the Paganini-Ladenburg cello of 1736, comprise the Paganini Quartet. On loan to Christoph Vandory of the Goldmund Quartet. Formerly part of the von Mendelssohn family quartet of Stradivaris in Berlin.
Gibson	1734	Habisreutinger Foundation	Currently on loan to violist Ursula Sarnthein of the Swiss string trio Trio Oreade.

=== Cellos ===
Antonio Stradivari built between 70 and 80 cellos in his lifetime, of which 63 are extant.

Sobriquet	Year	Provenance	Notes
ex Vatican Stradivarius	1620*/1703	Emmanuel Gradoux-Matt, New York; Bought by Philip Glass for Wendy Sutter; Academia de Arte de Florencia (Mexico), on loan to Nadège Rochat	Originally made by Nicolo Amati as a viola da gamba c. 1620, reworked into a cello by Amati's student, Antonio Stradivari.
ex-Du Pré; ex-Harrell	1673	Jacqueline du Pré; Lynn Harrell; Yo-Yo Ma; Istvan Vardai	
General Kyd; ex-Leo Stern	1684	Leo Stern; Los Angeles Philharmonic; Robert deMaine	Stolen in 2004 and later recovered.
Marylebone	1688		Donated to the Smithsonian Institution in 1997 by Herbert R. Axelrod; part of the Axelrod quartet.
Medici	1690	Ferdinando de' Medici, Grand Prince of Tuscany Conservatorio Luigi Cherubini Galleria dell'Accademia Florence, Italy	Displayed to the public in the Museo degli Strumenti Musicali as part of the collection of the Conservatorio Luigi Cherubini, accessed through the Galleria dell'Accademia; part of the Medici Quintet. The Medici Cello is one of the only three surviving Stradivari cellos of large dimensions that have not been reduced in size
Barjansky	1690	Alexandre Barjansky; Julian Lloyd Webber	
ex-Gendron; ex-Lord Speyer	1693	Edgar Speyer; Kunststiftung NRW	On loan to Maria Kliegel; previously loaned to Maurice Gendron (1958–1990).
Spanish Court or Decorado	1694	Patrimonio Nacional, Palacio Real, Madrid, Spain	Collectively known as Quinteto Real or Quinteto Palatino (The Royal Quintet or Palace Quintet) when included with the violin duo, los Decorados (Spanish I and II 1687–1689), Bajo Palatino cello of 1700 and the Spanish Court viola of 1696. Is the original quartet. See Juan Ruiz Casaux.
Bajo Palatino	1700	Patrimonio Nacional, Palacio Real, Madrid, Spain	collectively known as Quinteto Palatino or Quinteto Palatino (The Royal Quintet or Palace Quintet) when included with the violin duo, los Decorados (Spanish I and II), Spanish Court cello of 1694 and the Spanish Court viola of 1696.
Bonjour	1696	Abel Bonjour; Robert Cohen Canada Council for the Arts	On loan to Bryan Cheng.
Lord Aylesford	1696	Sasakawa Music Foundation	On loan to Pablo Ferrández; previously loaned to Danjulo Ishizaka and Janos Starker (1950–1965).
Castelbarco	1699	United States Library of Congress	Presented by Gertrude Clarke Whittall.
Cholmondeley Cello	1698	Anonymous collector	Purchased in 1988 for a record £682,000 (US$1.2 million)
Stauffer; ex-Cristiani	1700	Jean Louis Duport; Elise Barbier Cristiani	On display at the Museo Civico Ala Ponzone.
Servais	1701	National Museum of American History	On display at the National Museum of American History.
Paganini-Countess of Stanlein	1707	Bernard Greenhouse	Sold in January 2012 for ca. $6 million to Montreal arts patron; (later identified as Jacqueline Desmarais) on loan to Stéphane Tétreault.
Boni-Hegar	1707	owned by Christen Sveaas	On loan to Andreas Brantelid
Boccherini; Romberg	1709		Formerly played by Pablo Casals.
Markevitch; Delphino	1709	Owned by the Fridart Foundation.	
Gore Booth; Baron Rothschild	1710	Rocco Filippini; Gustav Bloch-Bauer	Stolen by the Nazis from Gustav Bloch-Bauer in 1938, and remained with the German authorities until 1956. The cello features in the movie Woman in Gold, being played by Bloch-Bauer, who had been loaned the instrument for life by the Rothschild family.
Duport	1711	Mstislav Rostropovich (1974–2007)	
Mara	1711	Heinrich Schiff; Amedeo Baldovino	Lost in July 1963 when ferry SS Ciudad de Asuncion between Montevideo and Buenos Aires caught fire and sank; later recovered in pieces in its case and rebuilt by W.E. Hill & Sons.
Davidov	1712	Count Matvei Wielhorski (1794–1866); Karl Davidov; Jacqueline du Pré	On loan to Yo-Yo Ma.
Batta-Piatigorsky	1714	J. P. Thibout; Alexander Batta; W.E. Hill & Sons; Baron Johann Knoop; Gregor Piatigorsky	Currently displayed at the Metropolitan Museum of Art, New York City.
de Vaux	1717		On loan to Adam Klocek.
Amaryllis Fleming	1717	ex-Blair-Oliphant, ex-Hegar, ex-Kühn, ex-Küchler	Formerly owned by Amaryllis Fleming, half sister to writers Ian and Peter Fleming. Neck, head and table are not original, after extensive repairs in the 18th century by the Spanish luthier José Contreras; auctioned in 2008.
Becker	1719	Duke of Marlborough; Hugo Becker; Juilliard School (since 1999)	
Piatti	1720	Carlos Prieto	Formerly part of the von Mendelssohn family quartet of Stradivaris in Berlin.
Vaslin, La Belle Blonde	1723	LVMH	Owned by Olive-Charlier Vaslin from 1827 to 1869. Displayed at the South Kensington Special Exhibition of 1872. Purchased as part of a quartet of Stradivari for $200,000 by banker Felix M. Warburg in the 1920s. The quartet was frequently loaned to the Musical Art Quartet for performances, where it was played by Marie Roemaet-Rosanov. In 1968, Warburg's son Gerald Felix Warburg—a cellist himself—sold the instrument to Henriette Polak-Schwarz. Other owners included Narcisse Girard, Jules Gallay, and Martin Lovett. On loan to Henri Demarquette.
Haussman	1724	Hausman family Max Adler Chuck Meyer	1839–1861: Georg (George) Hausmann. 1861–1909: Robert Hausmann (cellist, Joachim Quartet). 1909–1927: Mrs. Hausmann (widow). 1927–1944: Max Adler & family (Chicago). From 1944: Edmund Kurtz.
Baudiot	1725	Gregor Piatigorsky	Bequeathed to Evan Drachman by his grandfather Gregor Piatigorsky.
Chevillard	1725	Museu da Música, Lisbon	
Marquis de Corberon; ex-Loeb	1726	Royal Academy of Music	Formerly owned by Hugo Becker and Audrey Melville, who bequeathed it to the RAM in 1960. Melville's friend, Zara Nelsova, held it until her death in 2002, as a condition of Melville's bequest. Currently on loan to Steven Isserlis.
Comte de Saveuse	1726		Comte de Saveuse d'Abbeville, Edward Latter, Archibald Hartnell, Michael Edmonds, subsequently lent to Michael Evans.
Feuermann; ex-De Munck	1730	Emmanuel Feuermann; Aldo Parisot; Sasakawa Music Foundation	On loan to Camille Thomas
Pawle	1730	Ludwig Knoop; Hugo Becker; Emil Herrmann; Caroline Marmon Fesler; Marie Roemaet-Rosanoff; Paul Olefsky; Chimei Museum	Once loaned to Yo-Yo Ma in 1999 when Petunia's neck was damaged before a concert in Taiwan.
Braga	1731	Gaetano Braga	On loan to Myung-wha Chung.
Stuart	1732	Frederick the Great, Steven Honigberg, Sergei Roldugin	According to Vladimir Putin, his friend Sergei Roldugin bought the instrument for $12M.
Paganini-Ladenburg	1736	Emil Herrmann, (1935–1946); Corcoran Gallery of Art; Sasakawa Music Foundation	This cello, and the Paganini-Desaint violin of 1686, the Paganini-Conte Cozio di Salabue violin of 1727 and the Paganini-Mendelssohn viola of 1731, comprise the Paganini Quartet. On loan to Raphael Paratore of the Goldmund Quartet.

=== Guitars ===
Five complete guitars by Stradivari exist, and a few fragments of others – including the neck of a sixth guitar, owned by the Conservatoire de Musique in Paris. These guitars have ten (doubled, five-course) strings, which was typical of the era.

Sobriquet	Year	Provenance	Notes
Hill	1688	Ashmolean Museum at Oxford University	ex-Kabayao-Dolfus Stradivarius 1724
Sabionari	1679	(Owned by a private collector)	Currently the only playable Stradivari guitar. Contemporary to the early painted violins "Sunrise" and "Hellier". Like many other baroque guitars, it had been redesigned to follow the instrumental practice at the beginning of the 19th century. Recently it was restored by Lorenzo Frignani to the original baroque configuration with five-course strings.
Rawlins	1700	National Music Museum, South Dakota.	Previously owned by violinist Louis Krasner.
Vuillaume	1711	Cite de la Musique, Paris	Owned by Jean-Baptiste Vuillaume; acquired 1880

=== Harps ===
The only surviving Stradivarius harp is the arpetta (little harp), owned by San Pietro a Maiella Music Conservatory in Naples, Italy.

=== Mandolins ===
There are two known extant Stradivari mandolins. The Cutler-Challen Choral Mandolino of 1680 is in the collection of the National Music Museum at the University of South Dakota in Vermillion, South Dakota. The other, dated c. 1706, is owned by private collector Charles Beare of London. Known as Mandolino Coristo, it has eight strings.

=== Bows ===
A Stradivarius bow, The King Charles IV Violin Bow attributed to the Stradivari Workshop, is currently in the collection of the National Music Museum Object number: 04882, at the University of South Dakota in Vermillion, South Dakota. The Rawlins Gallery violin bow, NMM 4882, is attributed to the workshop of Antonio Stradivari, Cremona, c. 1700. This is one of two bows attributed to the workshop of Antonio Stradivari. The other was part of the Amaryllis Fleming Collection, the Paul Rosenbaum Collection, and the Maurice and Marta Clare Collection. It is currently in a private collection in Munich.
