= Katalin Kokas =

Hungarian musician (born 1978)

Katalin Kokas (born 22 November 1978 in Pécs) is a Hungarian violinist and violist. Kokas has performed with orchestras including the Israel Chamber Orchestra, Franz Liszt Chamber Orchestra and Taiwan Philharmonic. She has studied at the Conservatory of Toronto and graduated with honors from the Franz Liszt Academy of Music in Budapest. She married the Hungarian violinist Barnabás Kelemen, and now has four children.

== Early life ==
Her father Ferenc Kokas, was the director of the Liszt Ferenc Music School of Kaposvár for several decades. Her mother Ágnes Farkas de Boldogfa, a cello teacher, hailed from the Hungarian noble family Farkas de Boldogfa from the Zala county. Her maternal grandparents were György Farkas de Boldogfa (1924–1988), was a physical education associate professor, president of the Baranya County Gymnastics Association, textbook writer, and Ágnes Dulánszky de Doliánszk.

Kokas began studying violin in Kaposvár with Béla Gyánó when she was five years old. She continued her studies with György Papp in Pécs and later at the Franz Liszt Music Academy in Budapest where, at the age of 11, she was taught by Ferenc Halász and Dénes Kovács. She received a full scholarship to study at the Conservatory of Toronto with Lóránd Fenyves when she was 16. She returned to Budapest, graduating with honours from the Franz Liszt Academy of Music in Budapest.

== Career ==
Katalin has six recordings on Hungaroton and BMC records. She is director of the Kaposvár International Chamber Music Festival, which she founded in 2010. Past performers have included Joshua Bell, Pekka Kuusisto, Zoltán Kocsis and Ferenc Rados.

== Instruments ==
The Cecilia Stradivarius violin, an antique dated to 1697, was loaned to Kokas for five years in 2011 by the now defunct Zelnik István Southeast Asian Gold Museum. The Cecilia is said to have arrived in Hungary with Archbishop János Pyrker, who purchased several high quality instruments in Venice. It was sold after World War II; the violin's history between the war and its reappearance in Hungary are not known.

She also plays a 1863 Luigi Fabris viola.
