= Viotti Stradivarius =

The Viotti; ex-Bruce Stradivarius of 1709 is an antique violin constructed by luthier Antonio Stradivari of Cremona (1644–1737). It is one of only 700 known extant Stradivari instruments. It is part of the collection of the Chimei Museum in Taiwan.

== History ==
The violin receives its name from its first known owner, violinist Giovanni Battista Viotti, who is said to have received it as a love token from Catherine the Great. Viotti is thought to have commissioned the construction of at least one replica of this violin. Subsequent owners include Mr. Menessier, 1824; Mr Brochant de Villiers; Mr Meunié, 1860; Jean-Baptiste Vuillaume; Pierre Silvestre, on behalf of William E. Hill & Sons, 1897; Baron Knoop, 1897; Mr R. C. Baker, 1905; Lewis Bruce; and J. F. L. Bruce, after whom it is also named.

The Viotti; ex-Bruce Stradivarius, considered in very good condition, and free of the wear and repairs evinced by many other instruments of the period, was last purchased by the Royal Academy of Music, for GB£3.5 million in September 2005. Its provenance was also a major factor in the violin's valuation. Funding was provided by HM Government in lieu of Inheritance Tax, and by the National Art Collections Fund, the National Heritage Memorial Fund and many private donors.

The instrument will be displayed in the York Gate Collections, the Academy's free museum and research centre. The Viotti ex-Bruce will be heard as well as seen: the instrument will be played sparingly, under very controlled circumstances, at research events and occasional performances elsewhere.

As one of the greatest virtuoso violinists of his day, Viotti was very influential in the field of instrumental technique. His advocacy of Stradivarius violins was also key to the recognition of their maker as the foremost of all luthiers.

Viotti owned two Stradivari violins of 1709. The other instrument was subsequently owned by Marie Hall. He also owned a Stradivari violin of 1712, which became part of the Henry Hottinger Collection. It has been owned by Isaac Hurwitz.

It is part of the collection of the Chimei Museum in Taiwan.

== See also ==
- Stradivarius
- List of Stradivarius instruments
