= Duke of Alcantara Stradivarius =

Violin made by Antonio Stradivari in 1732

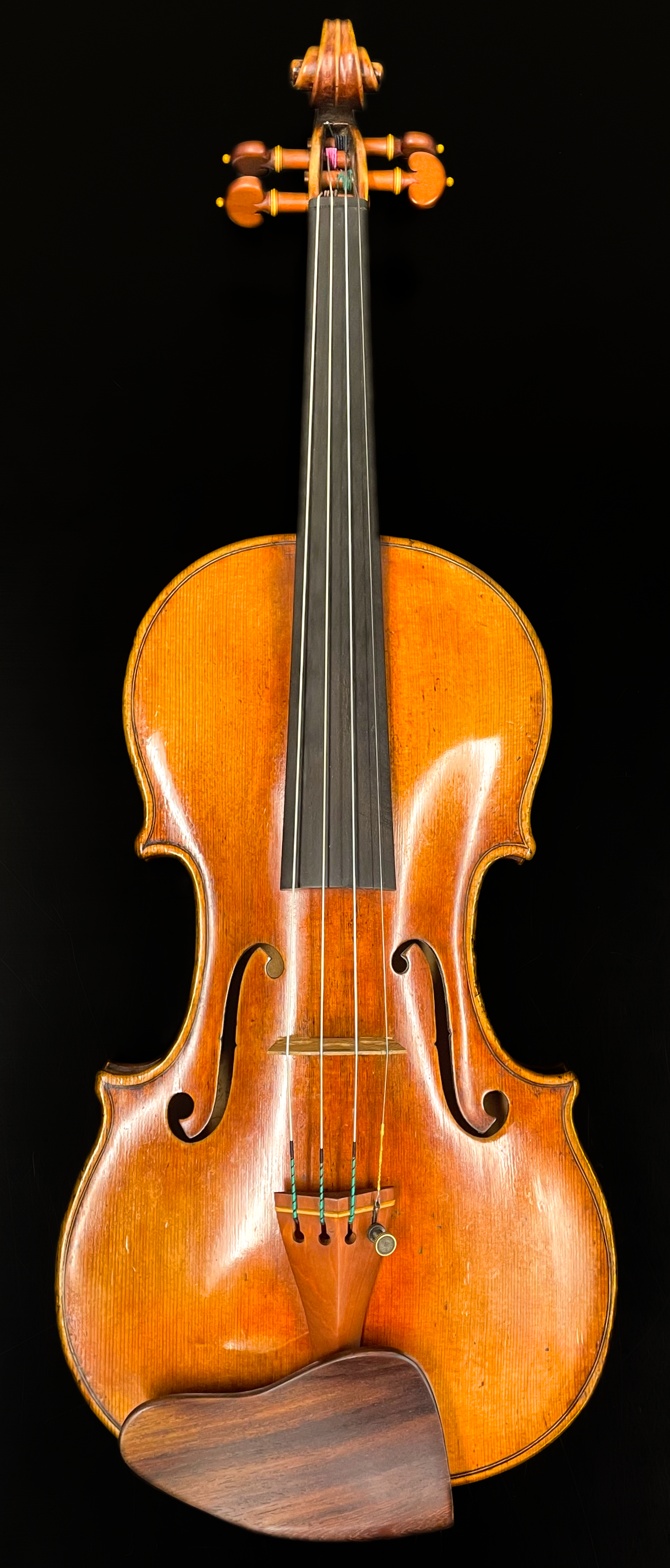
The 1732 Duke of Alcantara

The Duke of Alcantara Stradivarius is a violin made by Antonio Stradivari of Cremona, Italy in 1732. In 1929 it was purchased by a collector in the United States and later donated to the University of California, Los Angeles. A student at the university misplaced the violin in 1967 and the instrument went missing for 27 years. It reappeared when it was taken in for repairs and in 1995 UCLA successfully sued for ownership. The instrument was valued at around US$2,000,000 in 2014 (equivalent to US$2,700,000 in 2025).

== Ownership ==
=== Early history ===
Legend has it that the instrument was named after an 18th-century Spanish nobleman who was referred to as the "Duke of Alcantara". The instrument was also allegedly owned by Napoleon I of France in the early 19th century. The violin was owned by Albert Caressa later in the 19th century. He sold it from his shop in Paris to a collector, Erich Lachmann of Berlin. In 1925, Lachmann sold the instrument to Dr. Steiner-Schweitzer, a collector in Switzerland. In 1929, the Stradivarius was bought by Rudolph Wurlitzer in New York and it was later transferred to one of his properties in Cincinnati. In 1945, the violin was sold to Ilya Schkolnik, the newly appointed concertmaster to the Baltimore Symphony Orchestra. In the late 1950s, he moved to Los Angeles and the instrument was sold to oilman Milton Vedder. He died shortly after and his wife, Genevieve Vedder, donated it in 1961 to the University of California, Los Angeles's music department (now the UCLA Herb Alpert School of Music). Professor of violin and musicology Marrocco Thomas performed on the Stradivarius until 1967.

=== Theft ===
In mid-1967, David Margetts, a graduate student and second violinist of the Feri Roth String Quartet at UCLA, was lent the instrument. It was kept in a double case with a 1950s violin by Ansaldo Poggi and bows by François Tourte and Markus Fischer. On the evening of August 2, 1967, the Stradivarius disappeared while Margetts was shopping for groceries in Pasadena after a rehearsal in Hollywood. Margetts has stated that he did not know whether he placed the instrument case on top of his car and drove off, or if it was stolen from inside his vehicle. Margetts sent notices to pawn shops and the police, but received no information as to the violin's whereabouts. Nadia Tupica, the owner of a local music store and a retired Spanish teacher, claimed to have discovered the Stradivarius in a double case on the side of a highway on-ramp later that month. Tupica recalled that she stopped on the road to pick up what she thought was an abandoned infant, which turned out instead to be a violin case. Tupica died in 1978, and the double case with the Stradivarius was handed over to her nephew Jefferson Demarco. As part of Demarco's divorce settlement case in late 1993, the violin was awarded to his former wife, Teresa Salvato, an amateur violinist who lived in Riverside.

Shortly after gaining possession of the violin in January 1994, Salvato lent the Stradivarius to her teacher Michael Sand who took it to Joseph Grubaugh in Petaluma for maintenance. Grubaugh looked for the violin in a catalogue by the American Federation of Violin and Bow Makers to find it was a real Stradivarius and was marked as stolen from UCLA. Grubaugh immediately phoned UCLA. After the instrument's repairs were completed, Grubaugh gave the instrument back to Sand who then returned it to Salvato, but discussions between lawyers hired by UCLA and Salvato immediately began. After months of Salvato ignoring calls, campus police officers appeared at her home in May 1994 and threatened to arrest her. To avoid arrest or giving up the violin, Salvato remained secluded in her home for months and once stayed in a hotel. On October 14, UCLA lawyers achieved an injunction to force Salvato to disclose the location of the violin, but instead it was decided that she would surrender the instrument to UCLA's Fowler Museum where it would remain unplayed until the Los Angeles County Superior Court could decide who is the owner. A few days later on October 17, the violin was authenticated and sent to the museum.

=== Recovery ===
Over a year later on December 1, 1995, it was determined in court that the Stradivarius along with the Poggi and the missing bows would be returned to UCLA and Salvato would receive a payment of US$11,500. Later in the same month, Alexander Treger, concertmaster of the Los Angeles Philharmonic and also a UCLA professor, performed on the violin at a private recital at the UCLA chancellor's residence. At the time of the settlement, the Duke of Alcantara was estimated to have a value of at least US$800,000.

The Duke of Alcantara usually stays locked in a vault at UCLA's Fowler Museum. In recent years, winners of the UCLA Philharmonia's All Star Concerto Competition and the Atwater Kent String Concerto Competition have the chance to play on the violin, typically as a soloist with the UCLA Philharmonia or UCLA Symphony. As a result of budget cuts, university officials in 2006 considered selling the violin, but advocates successfully campaigned for the school to keep the violin. In 2020, UCLA was given a second Stradivarius violin which will arrive in 2025.

== Instrument ==
Stradivarius crafted the Duke of Alcantara around the age of 88. Experts say that the violin is built more clumsily than some of his earlier works in terms of the varnish and cut of the f-holes, and there is speculation that Stradivarius' sons may have helped him craft parts of it.

Although it is known in records that the instrument was crafted in 1732, the interior label dates has 1727 written, thus there is some speculation on whether the violin could be a composite or that someone tried to tamper with the original label of the violin to raise its price.

== See also ==
- List of Stradivarius instruments
