= Gould Stradivarius =

Antique Violin

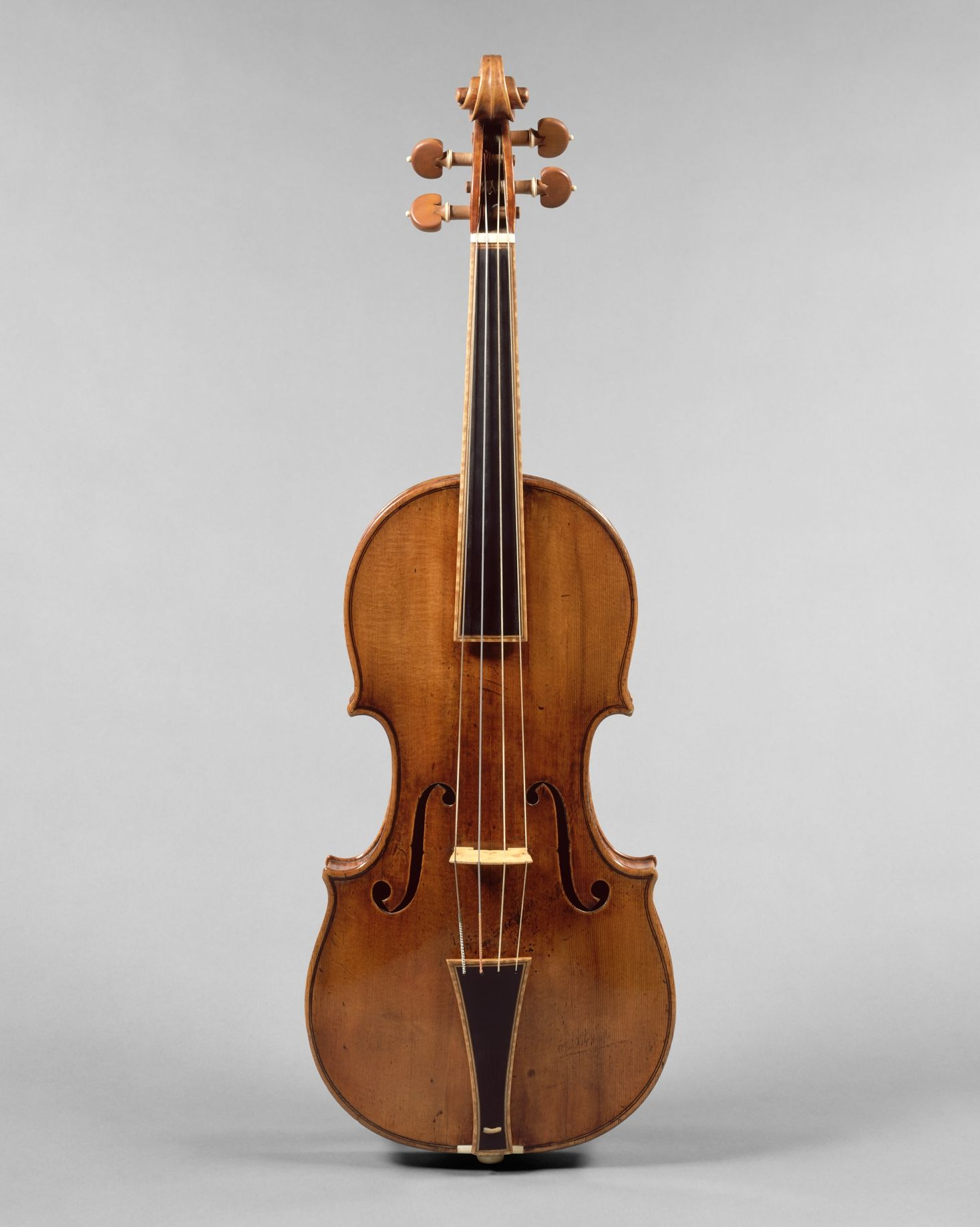
The Gould (1693)

The Gould Stradivarius of 1693 is a violin made by the Italian luthier Antonio Stradivari of Cremona (1644-1737). This violin is a product of Stradivari's long-pattern and has been modified into a baroque violin configuration by luthier Frederick J. Lindeman located in Amsterdam, Netherlands. It is in a collection at the Metropolitan Museum of Art in America, New York City.

== Ownership ==
The Gould violin's ownership traces back to 1820 by an owner listed as "Marquis de Villers". Around 1850, a French violinist and celebrated teacher Charles Dancla bought the instrument and in 1880, the violin was then owned by person identified as M. Labitte (Reims, France), possibly having been Louis Labitte, a collector of musical manuscripts. The violin was purchased again in 1897 by a man with the name Rev. Albert Willan until about 1900 when the violin was sold to the Polish violinist and composer Emil Młynarskyi.

In 1918, the violin was bought by the Allgemeine Musikgesellschaft (Basel, Switzerland) and was used until 1928, when the violin was sold by the Albert Caressa firm to George Gould. The instrument stayed with George Gould until 1955, when George Gould bequeathed the violin to the Metropolitan Museum of Art where it now currently lies.

== Instrument ==
The Gould is named after one of its owners and eventual donor, George Gould, who had given the instrument to the Metropolitan Museum of Art in 1955. In 1974, a careful decision was made to put the instrument back into a "baroque" form so that artists that specialize in historical performances could use the instrument. It is considered the only violin by Stradivari that has been returned to a baroque setup and "is regularly used for performance of period repertoire."

== See also ==
- List of Stradivarius instruments
