= Léon Reynier =

French violinist

Léon Reynier (11 August 1833 – 5 May 1895) was a well known and greatly appreciated French virtuoso violinist.

== Life ==
Reynier was born in Saint-Cloud. He is said to have been presented by Napoleon III with a richly varnished 1681 orange-reddish Stradivarius. A pupil of Lambert Massart, he was awarded first prize in 1848 at the Conservatoire de Paris. From 1875 to 1879 he became one of the musicians in the French chamber music society La Trompette founded in 1860, along with Léon Hollander (2nd violin), Benjamin Godard (viola) and Jules Delsart (violoncello).

He was the dedicatee of the string quartet of César Franck.

He died in Paris aged 61.

== See also ==
- List of Stradivarius instruments
