= Master Players Concert Series =

The Master Players Concert Series (MP; MPCS) is a flagship, in-residence concert organization at the University of Delaware (UD), founded in 2004 by producing artistic director Xiang Gao. Under his leadership, Master Players presents classical, crossover, world and jazz music, dance, musical theatre, family pop concerts, outreach education, community concerts, and the Master Players Festival.

The Master Players Concert Series brings international artists and programs to the University of Delaware and the surrounding communities. Most recently, MP hosted the Juilliard String Quartet in November 2015. Delaware Division of the Arts has said that it is “the most creative concert presenting organization in the area.”
