= Paul Robertson (violinist) =

English classical violinist (1952–2016)

- Born: 1 November 1952; East London
- Died: 26 July 2016 (aged 63)
- Occupation: violinist
- Parent(s): John Robertson, Esther née Dudekof

Paul Alan Reuben Robertson (1952–2016) was a violinist and founder of the Music Mind Spirit Trust.

He grew up in Oxford where he was tutored in the violin by Manoug Parikian. He went to the Royal Academy of Music where his teachers included Sidney Griller and Neville Marriner. He was a founder of the Medici String Quartet in 1971 and was its first violin until 2008 when his aorta ruptured, causing serious illness and a near-death experience. He then founded the Music Mind Spirit Trust with his wife, Chika Yamauchi, to explore and research the spiritual and scientific aspects of music. He was an honorary fellow and associate professor at Green Templeton College, Oxford and a cultural leader at the World Economic Forum in Davos.
