= Joachim–Ma Stradivarius =

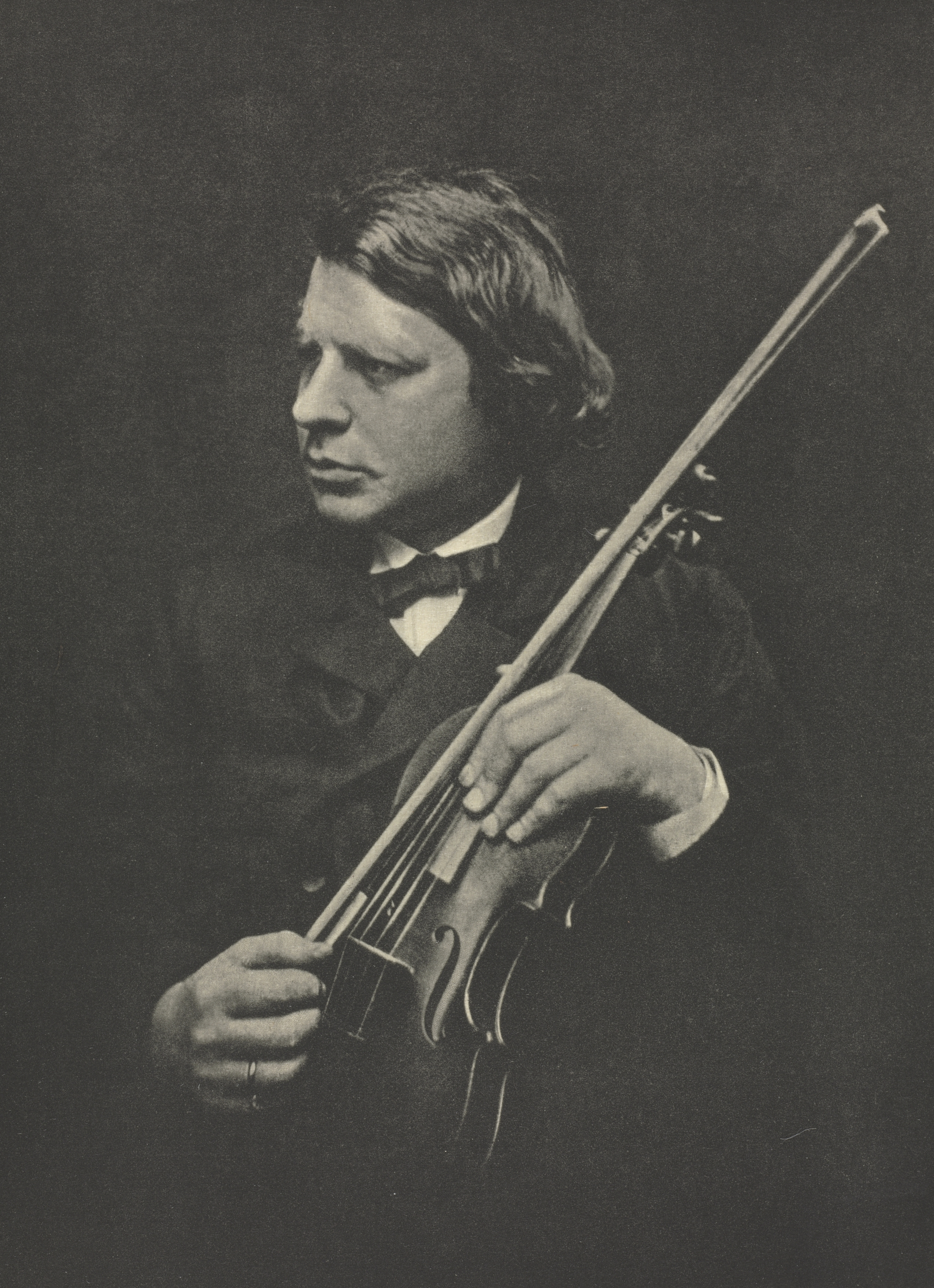
- Joachin and violin by Julia Margaret Cameron
- Artist: Antonio Stradivari
- Year: 1714
- Medium: maple and spruce
- Website: Joachim–Ma Stradivarius in the Cozio Archive at tarisio.com

The Joachim–Ma Stradivarius is a violin made by the celebrated luthier Antonio Stradivari in Cremona, Italy in 1714 – during his "Golden Period" – and named for two of its most famous owners, Hungarian virtuoso Joseph Joachim (1831–1907) and Chinese violinist and pedagogue Si-Hon Ma.

== Description ==
The Strad described the instrument as having a "handsome two-piece quarter-cut maple back, mostly of broad curl ascending from the center joint. The quarter-cut maple ribs are of similar wood, and the maple head is of fainter broad curl. The two-piece spruce table is of fine grain broadening slightly toward the flanks, and the instrument’s varnish is of a rich red brown colour over an amber gold ground."

== History ==
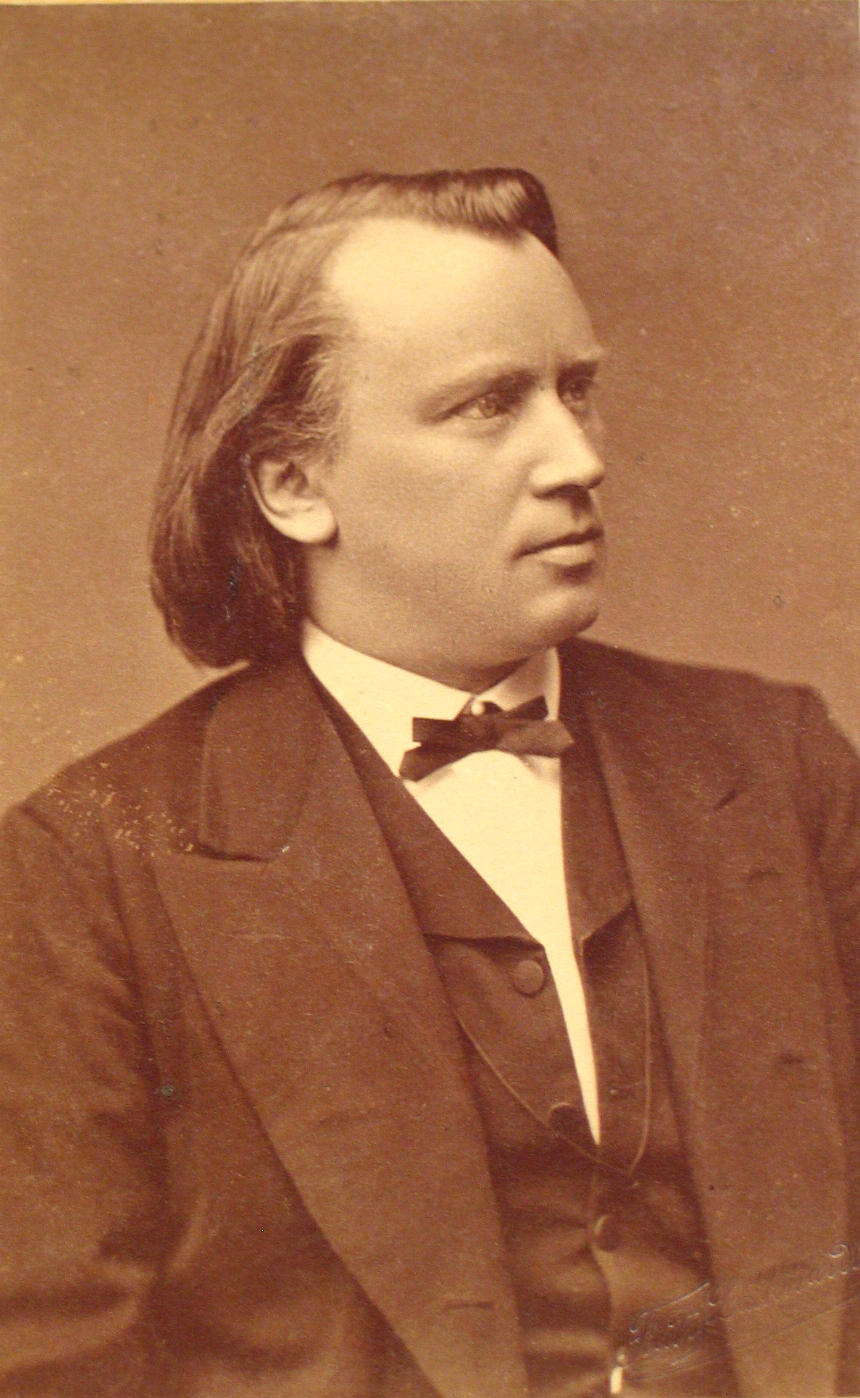
Johannes Brahms, 1876

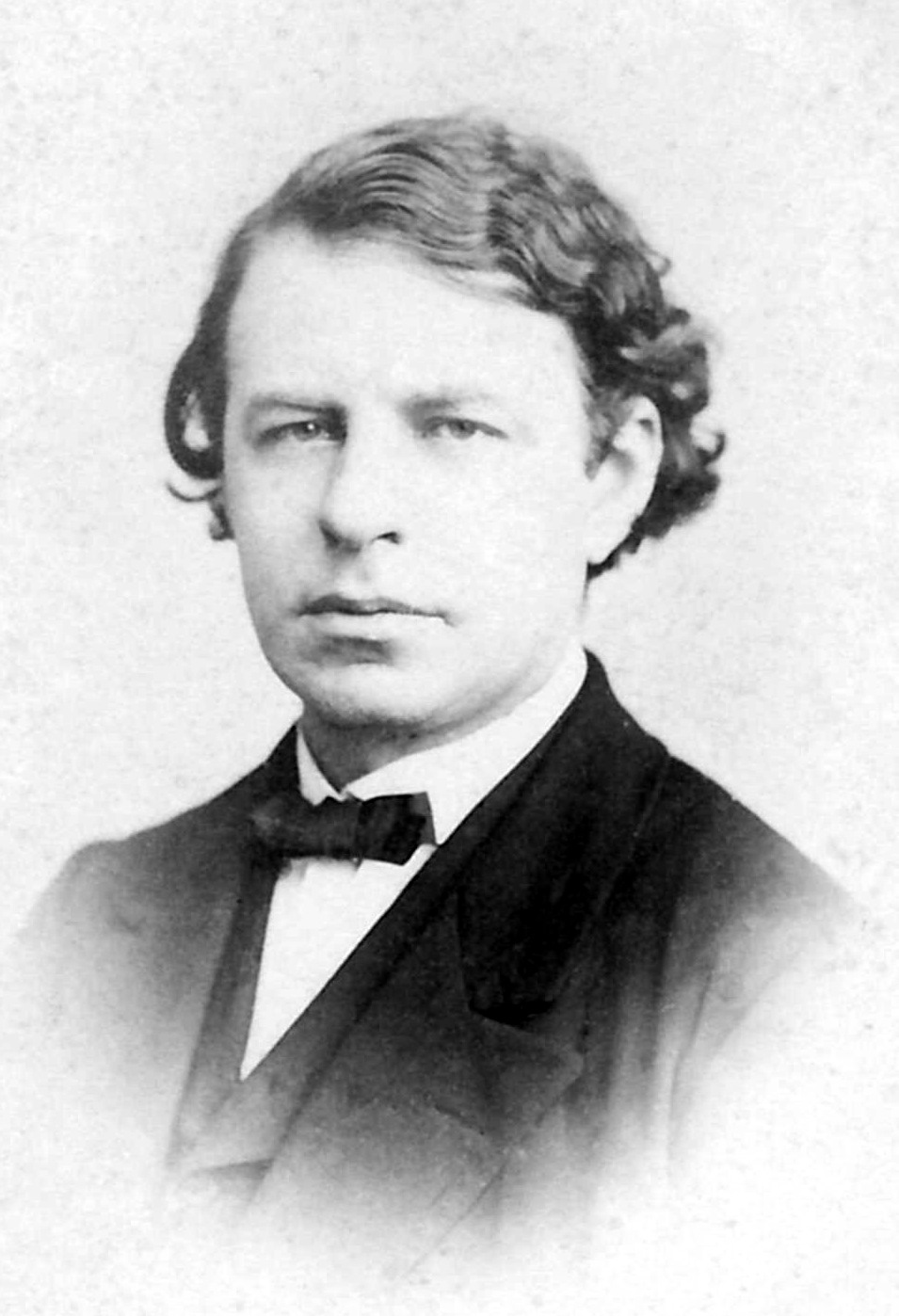
Joseph Joachim (by Reutlinger)

In 1849 the 18-year-old Joseph Joachim bought the violin. Music historians note the Hungarian's great friendship with Johannes Brahms, and his contribution of the cadenza to the composer's Violin Concerto in D Major, which Brahms had dedicated to him. Joachim "almost certainly" used the Stradivarius to premier the concerto by his friend, who conducted the performance.

Between 1885 and 1967 the owners of the violin included Dietrich A Muller and Baron Johann Knoop, followed by a number of collectors.

Ma Si-hon, a violinist and teacher from Canton in China, acquired the instrument in 1967. Ma treated himself to the instrument with the royalties from the invention of an improved violin mute. Ma acquired it in 1967 and it remained in his possession until his death in 2009. The violin was bequeathed to his alma mater, the New England Conservatory of Music. The instrument was scheduled to debut on campus at the conservatory recital on 23 April 2016.

It was sold for $11.3 million in early 2025 to fund scholarships. Valued at US$12 million – $18 million, it went on a roadshow in Sotheby’s London and Hong Kong before its auction in New York. The sale proceeds of $10 million (net of buyer's premium) fell short of auctioneers' estimates.

== Subjective appraisal ==
In material written to promote the upcoming auction in December 2024, Sotheby's noted "its exceptional sound – rich, complex, and full of depth. The tone is both sweet and rounded, with a richness that seems to grow with each note. There’s a warmth to the sound, with an underlying depth that gives it a unique character, making it far from ordinary."

Then-student at the New England Conservatory Alexi Kenney wrote a long piece in March 2017 describing his experience with the instrument, which was loaned to him for the duration of his diploma. Comparing it with his own violin, made by Stefan-Peter Greiner, he said: "For me, the most surprising thing about this instrument was its darkness tonally because I’ve heard so often that Strads are brilliant and incredibly cutting – warm, but not necessarily dark. So it has been really surprising in a nice way because I love that sort of darkness in an instrument. Again it’s night and day from the Greiner, which is all light and silvery sounds. It’s been such an interesting comparison to make."

Kenney continued: "When I got the Strad it was quite closed. It had been sitting in the museum for a while and before that it had been in Ma’s closet – I think he’d stopped playing for the last years of his life – so it was hard to play. I felt that I had to really strain myself to produce the sound – it was very difficult to project. After that first adjustment it started opening up a lot. Because the inherent character of this violin is on the darker side, it meant any adjustment really has to be on the brighter side in order to project in a hall."

Saying that the Strad was "just a perfect match" when performing the Brahms Concerto, he added: "Because each string has a clear character, tone and timbre, so playing Bach, which is polyphonic and multi-layered, is really fun. There are many possibilities for bringing different voices out, it’s kind of improvising."

Kenney also commented on the effect of having different strings: "I found that [the strings I use on my Grenier] were kind of dull on the Strad. Someone once said to me that sometimes the finest instruments need the ugliest strings, and when Ken Meyer adjusted it he put on [some different strings]. As soon as they were on, the Strad just started singing."

== See also ==
- Stradivarius
- List of Stradivarius instruments
