= Le Brun Stradivarius =

1712 violin

The Le Brun Stradivarius of 1712 is a violin made by Italian luthier Antonio Stradivari of Cremona (1644–1737). It is the only violin from Stradivari's golden period known to have been owned and played by the violinist Niccolò Paganini. When sold at a Sotheby's auction in London in November 2001 it achieved one of the highest prices ever paid for a violin at auction, and became the most expensive instrument in Europe.

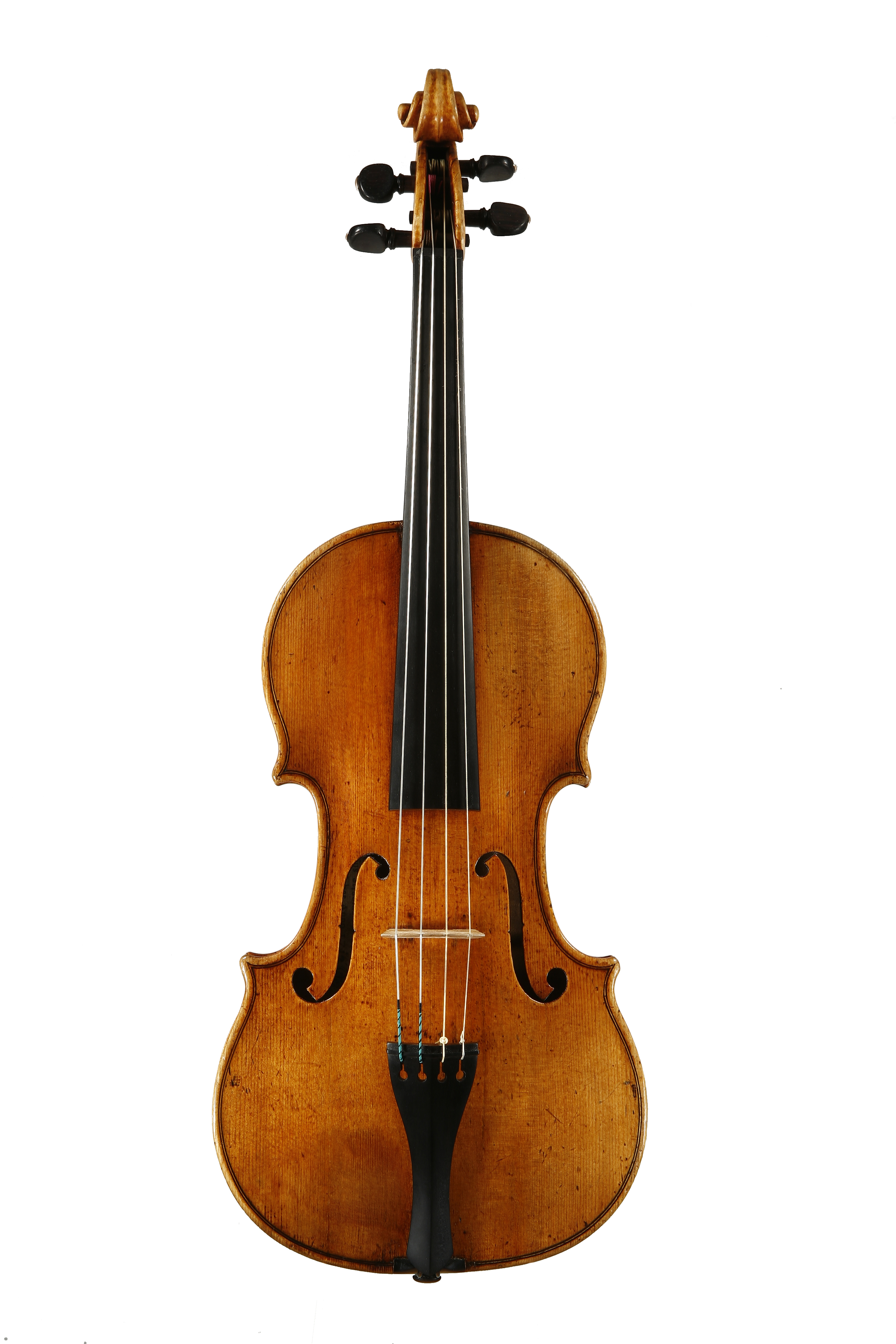
Le Brun Stradivari violin, 1712

== History of owners ==
Vicente Assensio (1730–c.1798), luthier to Charles IV of Spain, is the first person known to have been in possession of the violin, and to have worked on it, during his tenure at the Spanish Royal Court in Madrid, circa 1776–1791. This is evidenced by Assensio's inscription, in his own writing, at the bottom of Stradivari's original label, "Presviter Assensio compos...(illegible)." It is still unknown how the violin made its way from Stradivari's workshop in Cremona in 1712 to the Spanish Royal Court.

Niccolò Paganini (1782–1840) is known to have possessed the instrument after its time in the Spanish Royal Court. It is not clear how or when the violin went from the Spanish Royal Court into the hands of Paganini, or who may have been an intermediary. Some speculation has focused on Felice Pascuale Bachiocci, a long-time violin student of Paganini who had served as an Ambassador from France to the Spanish Royal Court in Madrid beginning in 1800. Bachiocci subsequently moved to Lucca in 1805 and studied violin with Paganini from 1805 to 1814 in both Lucca and Florence, while Paganini served as leader of his wife Elisa Bonaparte's court orchestra, and while Paganini was having a longstanding romantic affair with Elisa. Four months before his death in 1840, Paganini wrote a letter to his lawyer asking him to hide eleven of his high-priced violins from French government authorities who were aggressively seeking to collect on the foreclosure of his bankrupt Paris casino venture. It is not known whether the Le Brun Stradivarius was among these eleven violins designated for dissociation from Paganini's name.

The sales ledgers of one of the most prominent violin shops in Paris in the 19th century indicate "de Boutillier" as another owner of this violin. This could be the same person identified elsewhere in the business records as "Madame la Comtesse Boutillier" who also owned another unknown 1680 Stradivarius violin in Paris in 1878. No further information has yet been found about this owner.

Joseph Chardon (1843–1930) was a Paris violin maker and dealer of the firm Chanot & Chardon, who is known to have sold this violin to the well-known violinist, composer, and violin teacher Vincenzo Sighicelli in 1893. Sighicelli is not known to have sold this violin before he died in 1905.

Subsequently, another Paris violin dealer, Albert Caressa, noted that in the year 1914 this violin was the property of a Monsieur Charles Lebrun. Mr. Lebrun was a former attorney of considerable wealth who, according to the sales ledgers, had also owned other rare violins by Antonio Stradivari, Giuseppe Guarneri del Gesu, and Vincenzo Rugeri. The Sotheby's auction catalog from 2001 mistakenly printed that Lebrun sold this violin to the Boutillier family, but there is no evidence to support this, and the chronology of the business records indicates otherwise.

In 1922 the violin was sold by Albert Caressa to the Swiss architect Otto Heinrich Senn. Senn is believed to have kept this violin in his collection in Basel until his death in 1993.

In 2001 the violin came up for auction at Sotheby's, was owned briefly by an anonymous American investor in 2007, and was sold to its current owner, an American concert violinist, in 2008.

== Tree ring analysis ==
- Dendrochronology report: John C. Topham, Surrey (2001) "The dendrochronological analysis of the table reveals that the youngest growth rings on each side date from 1703 and 1705. This correlates well with other Stradivari instruments of the period, notably the 1711 Parke, the 1713 Gibson-Huberman and another 1715 violin. John Topham also notes that it is probable that all of the pieces from these four violins come from the same tree."

== See also ==
- Stradivarius
- List of Stradivarius instruments
