= Lambert Massart =

Belgian violinist (1811–1892)

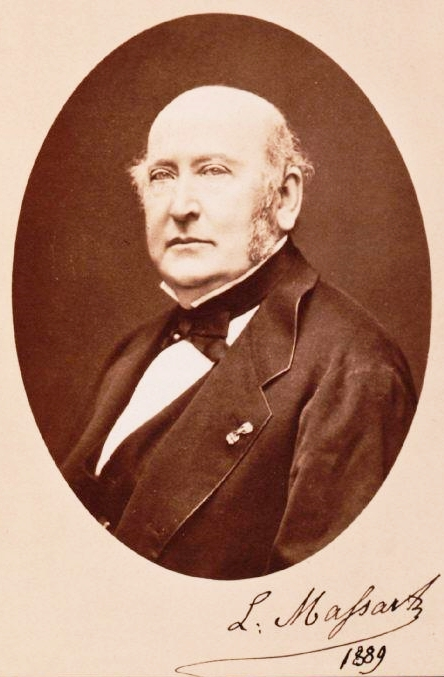
Portrait, 1889

Joseph Lambert Massart (19 July 1811 – 13 February 1892) was a Belgian violinist who has been credited with the origination of the systematic vibrato. He compiled The Art of Working at Kreutzer's Etudes, a supplement that contains 412 fingerings and bowings taken from his time studying with Rodolphe Kreutzer. He was an excellent String quartet player who gave many delightful chamber concerts, having also played Beethoven's Kreutzer Sonata in A minor with Franz Liszt on 23 May 1843.

== Biography ==
Massart was born in Liège, and was taught music first by his father Joseph Marie and later by his father's eldest brother Jean-Joseph, a disciple of Leonard-Joseph Gaillard. With the death of his uncle, Massart studied under the guidance of Ambroise Delaveux who then secured for him, from the local authorities of Liège, a scholarship at the Conservatoire de Paris, where his admission was then blocked by Luigi Cherubini on the grounds that Massart was a foreigner. He became then the favorite pupil and protégé of Kreutzer and his younger brother, Auguste Kreutzer, who took his brother's post as professor at the conservatory upon his death.

Despite being sponsored by King William I of the Netherlands, he was not accepted at the Conservatoire de Paris until 1829 because of his foreign status. He was appointed professor of violin at the Conservatoire de Paris in 1843 and subsequently taught there for 47 years as music professor. Among his pupils were Julius Conus, Fritz Kreisler, M. J. Niedzielski, František Ondříček, Léon Reynier, Henryk Wieniawski, Alfred De Sève, Isidor Lotto, Teresina Tua, and Charles Martin Loeffler.
