= Barbara Penny =

British violinist (1929–2007)

Barbara Penny (1929 – 2007) was a British violinist.

She was the first woman to play in the strings section of the Royal Philharmonic Orchestra. She attended Malvern Girls' College and received a scholarship to the Royal College of Music.

In April, 2008, a Stradivarius violin owned by Penny since 1965 was auctioned by Christie's for $1.2 million.
