= Xiang Gao =

Chinese violinist

- Born: 高翔 (Gāoxiáng); 1973–1974 (age 50–51); Fuzhou, China
- Origin: Beijing, China
- Genres: Classical
- Occupation: Violinist
- Website: xianggao.net

Xiang Gao (Chinese: 高翔; born 1973 or 1974) is a Chinese violinist. Gao has performed as a soloist for numerous world leaders, including two U.S. Presidents, three Chinese Presidents, and King Juan Carlos I of Spain. He is also the director and violinist for 6-WIRE, the University of Delaware's ensemble in residence.

== Biography ==
Gao was born in Beijing in 1973 or 1974. His mother and father played the violin professionally, and when he was eight years old, he began playing the violin. Gao’s skill led him to finish first in a national violin contest held in China later in his adolescence. In 1991, he moved to the United States. There he attended the University of Michigan School of Music, Theatre & Dance. Gao is currently the UD Trustees Distinguished Professor of Music at the University of Delaware, which he moved to in 2001.

Maggie Large of The Telegraph worte that Gao is "one of the first Chinese soloists to hit it big on the international scene".

== Personal life ==
Gao is married to Renee Dong, a linguist. The couple has a daughter.

== See also ==
- Master Players Concert Series
