= George Haddock (musician) =

English musician (1823–1907)

- George Haddock

Background information
- Born: George Haddock; 7 August 1823
- Origin: Killingbeck, Leeds
- Died: 12 September 1907 (aged 84) Leeds
- Genres: Classical
- Occupation: Musician
- Instrument: Violin

George Haddock (7 August 1823 – 12 September 1907) was an English violinist, and professor of music born in Killingbeck, Leeds. He was involved extensively in the music scene of Leeds and Bradford during the mid to late 19th century and founded the Leeds College of Music (later known as the Yorkshire College of Music and rebranded as Music House in 2022) in 1894.

== Biography ==
=== Early life ===
Haddock was brought up in a musical family with most members playing instruments. His brother Thomas Haddock, a violincellist taught by Robert Lindley, played in quartets with Paganini, de Bériot, Mendelssohn, J.W. Thirlwell, John David Loder, and Joseph Rudersdorff. These along with other visitors to the household including Ole Bull greatly influenced the young George eventually taking up the violin.

Initially his family wanted him to take up law and he started with a solicitor in Leeds with an office on Briggate. It became clear he had no inclination for law and was allowed to resume his musical studies.

His first teacher was Mr R.A.Brown, a professor of music in Leeds. He subsequently studied under Joseph Bywater, Henri Vieuxtemps and Bernhardt Molique.

=== Friendship with Henri Vieuxtemps ===
Haddock Family Grave, Beckett Street Cemetery

George first met Henri Vieuxtemps in 1846 when Henri came to Leeds. George enlisted the aid of friends to contact Vieuxtemps in order to play for him during his visit to Leeds. Subsequent to this meeting Vieuxtemps gave George violin lessons. They became close friends with George escorting his wife to all of his London concerts in 1846. Over the years the friendship grew and whenever Vieuxtemps visited Leeds he would stay with George.

George named one of his sons, Vieuxtemps Haddock (1853–1854), after the composer and dedicated both the book and a chapter to him.

=== Later life ===
In later life he became a professor of music (by 1853) and taught the violin to over 4,000 students including Frederick Delius. In 1894 George founded the Leeds College of Music and his sons Edgar and George Percy Haddock succeeded him as joint directors upon his death in 1907.

== Publications ==
A year prior to his death the book ‘Some Early Musical Recollections of G.Haddock’ was published detailing much of his life. The dedication in the book reads “To the memory of my dear old friend, Henri Vieuxtemps.”

== Collection ==
George had an extensive collection of musical instruments, including many violins and bows, and had been collecting for over 45 years at the time of his death. The following violins are known to have been in George Haddock's collection (list taken from Cozio archive)

- Violin, 1695, Carlo Giuseppe Testore
- 'Ford' Violin, 1703, Antonio Stradivari
- 'Haddock' Violin, 1734, Bartolomeo Giuseppe Guarneri
- 'Emperor, Gillott, Kubelik', Violin, 1715, Antonio Stradivari
- 'Haddock, Cater, Rostal' Violin, 1697 Antonio Stradivari
- 'Drummond Amati' Violin, 1694, Francesco Rugeri
- Violin, Giuseppe Guarneri
- 'Castelbarco, Haddock, Bromley Booth, Tarisio' Violin, 1730–34, Bartolomeo Giuseppe Guarneri

Others known to be in his collection include a 1673 Rugerius and a 1615 Antonio Amati as well as many more (in 1890 he estimated he had over 80 violins).

Described as “undoubtedly the largest and most valuable collection of bows in the world” his collection of bows included many from François Tourte.

In the chapter, in his book, that describes his collection he relates the story of the ‘Emperor’ Stradivarius (which he acquired in 1876) and 'Lady Hallé, Ernst' violin's.

Andrew Fountaine had acquired both in the early 19th century and kept both in a double case. Upon hearing Heinrich Wilhelm Ernst play the 'Lady Hallé, Ernst' violin Mr Fountaine gifted the violin to him. Ernst showed the violin to George in 1852.

Following the death of Ernst the violin passed through several hands before finally being selected by Wilma Neruda, wife of Charles Hallé around 1872. She had the violin for a months trial and the first big concert that she played the violin was in the St George's Hall in Bradford. Hallé asked George to listen to how the violin sounded from different parts of the hall. Upon George's confirmation that “It sounded wonderful and if Madame Neruda does not decide to have it, I shall” they decided to keep the violin.

== Personal life ==
George married Ann Marston in 1844 and they had seven children. He died on 12 September 1907 and is buried in Beckett Street Cemetery, Leeds.
