= Finnish Cultural Foundation =

Nonprofit supporting culture and science

Finnish Cultural Foundation (Finnish: Suomen Kulttuurirahasto) is a private nonprofit foundation dedicated to the promotion of culture and research in Finland. The foundation's assets are about 1.8 billion euros, which makes it one of the largest private foundations in Europe. Annual grants were more than 50 million euros in 2023.

The Finnish Cultural Foundation consists of the main fund and 17 regional funds. It was founded in 1939 to counterbalance Finnish cultural life as the Swedish-speaking Finns received significantly more funding because of their own foundation Svenska kulturfonden.
