= Jules Gallay =

French lawyer and music historian

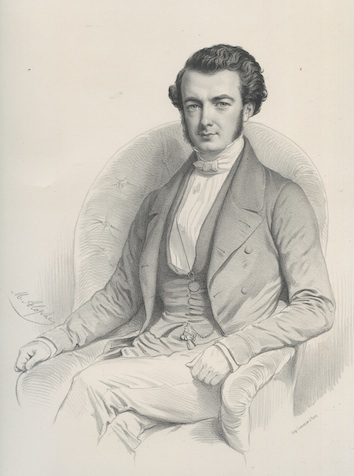
- Portrait of Jules Gallay
- Born: Jules-Félix Gallay; 4 September 1822; Saint-Quentin (Aisne)
- Died: 3 September 1897 (aged 74); Paris
- Occupations: Lawyer; Music historian

Jules Gallay (4 September 1822 – 3 September 1897) was a French lawyer and music historian.

== Biography ==
Born in a Genevese Protestant family, Jules Gallay was the son of Antoine Gallay, a naturalized French merchant.

A lawyer by the Court of Appeal of Paris, he became first deputy mayor of the 8th arrondissement of Paris on 9 July 1871.

Gallay was a member of the music section of the international jury at the 1873 Vienna World's Fair and wrote an official report on the arch instruments. He was a member of the admissions committee and the jury at the 1878 exposition de Paris.

He was a collaborator of the "supplements" to the Biographie universelle des musiciens by François-Joseph Fétis.

He was an assessor of the board of directors of the Society of Patronage of Protestant released prisoners and of the Administrative Committee of the Society for the Promotion of Primary Education among Protestants in France.

Gallay made various donations to several museums, including a violin by Francois-Louis Pique and the portrait of Marin Marais painted by André Bouys to the Musée instrumental of the Conservatoire de Paris in 1888.

On 14 June 1847 Gallay married Laure Goüin, a granddaughter of Henri Jacques Goüin-Moisant and grand-niece of General-count Pierre Dumoustier. Mrs Gallay succeeded Ms Davillier at the head of the Association protestante de bienfaisance de Paris, which she presided from 1871 to 1892 (replaced by Ms de Neuflize). They were the grands-parents of Robert Gallay, confounder and general secretary of the International Tennis Federation (whose daughter, tennis player Jacqueline, married Pierre Liotard-Vogt), and Marie-Antoinette Gallay, wife of general Charles Jordan.

== Some publications ==
- Les luthiers italiens aux XVIIe et XVIIIe siècles. (1868, 1869, 2010)
- Le mariage de la musique avec la danse (1864) : précédé d'une introduction historique et accompagné de notes éclaircissements (1870)
- Les instruments des écoles italiennes : catalogue, précédé d'une introduction et suivi de notes sur les principaux maîtres. (1872, 2010)
- La Musique en Lorraine, étude rétrospective d'après les archives locales (1882, 1972)
- Un inventaire sous la terreur : État des instruments de musique relevé chez les émigrés et condamnés (1890, 2010)
- Les instruments à archet à l'Exposition universelle de 1867 (1980, 1981)
- Les instruments à archet: à l'exposition universelle de Vienne, en 1873 (1875)

== Bibliography ==
- François-Joseph Fétis, Biographie universelle des musiciens et bibliographie générale de la musique.
- Dictionnaire Biographique de l'Aisne
- Florence Gétreau, Aux origines du musée de la musique : les collections instrumentales du Conservatoire de Paris : 1793-1993, 1996
- Mariano Pérez Gutiérrez, Diccionario de la música y los músicos: (F-O), 1985
- François Michel, Encyclopédie de la musique, Volume 2, 1959
