= Medici String Quartet =

British string quartet

The Medici String Quartet was a British string quartet.

It was formed in 1971 and active until 2007 when founder and first violin Paul Robertson became seriously ill. Robertson died of a heart condition on 26 July 2016.

The Medici Quartet was the ensemble-in-residence at the University of Surrey from 1996, as well as having a strong link to the Royal College of Music in Stockholm.

== Members ==
- Paul Robertson, first violin, who played a Domenico Montagnana violin made in Venice in 1729.
- Stephen Morris, second violin, who played a Joannes Udalricus Eberle violin made in Prague in 1760.
- Ivo-Jan van der Werff, viola, who played a Giovanni Grancino viola made in Milan circa 1690.
- Anthony Lewis, cello, who played a Giacinto Rugeri cello made in Cremona circa 1690.
