= Ladislaus Pyrker =

Hungarian Cistercian abbot, archbishop and poet

Ladislaus Pyrker O. Cist.
- Archbishop of Eger
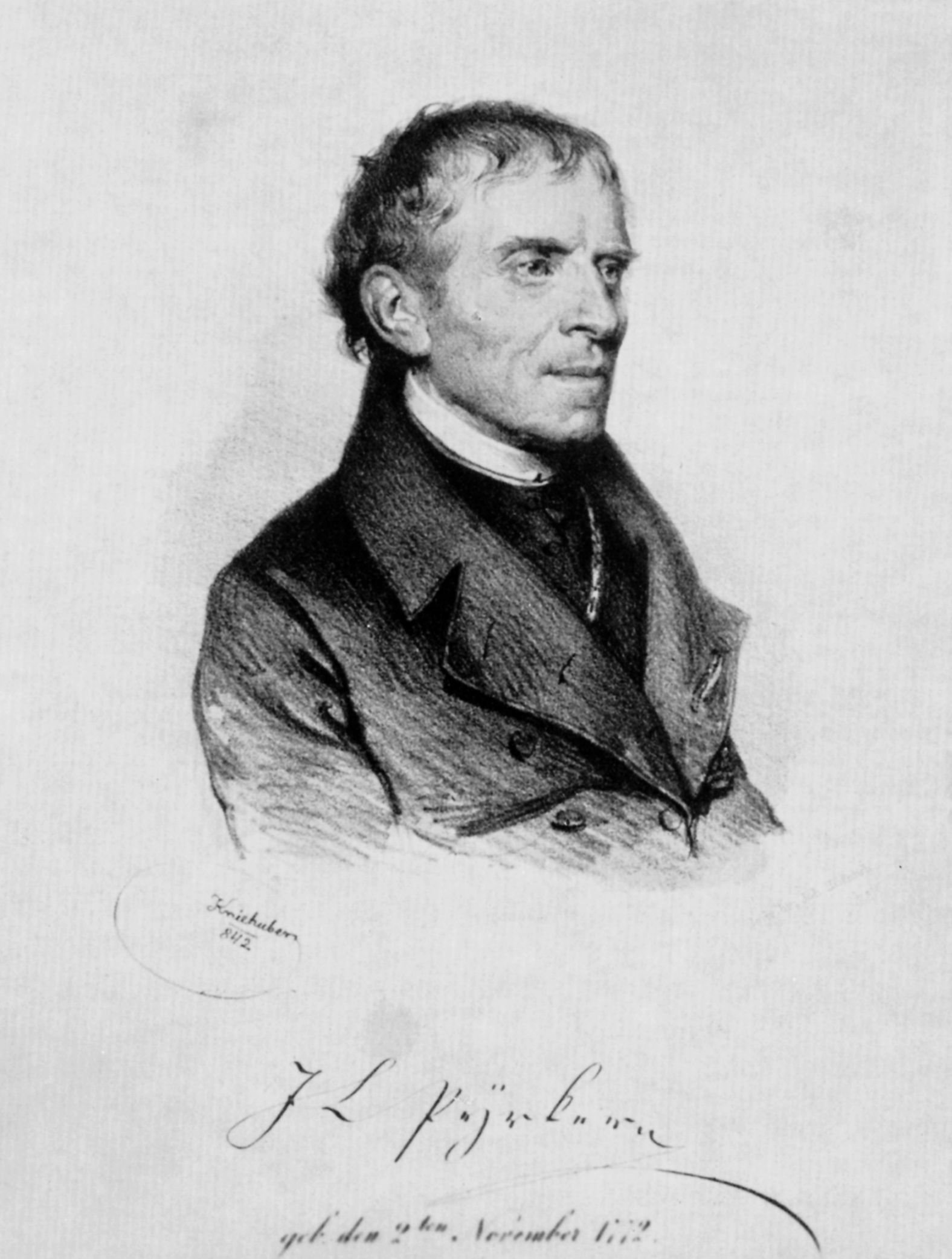
- Johann Ladislaus Pyrker, Lithograph by Josef Kriehuber, 1842
- Native name: Pyrker János László
- Church: Catholic Church
- Archdiocese: Archdiocese of Eger
- In office: 9 April 1827 – 2 December 1847
- Predecessor: István Fischer
- Successor: Béla Bartakovics
- Previous posts: Patriarch of Venice (1820-1827); Bishop of Spiš (1818-1820)

Orders
- Ordination: 4 December 1796
- Consecration: 18 April 1819 by Sigismund Anton von Hohenwart

Personal details
- Born: 2 November 1772 Nagyláng, Soponya, Kingdom of Hungary
- Died: 2 December 1847 (aged 75) Vienna, Archduchy of Austria, Austrian Empire

Johann Ladislaus Pyrker (von Oberwart) (von Felsö-Eör) (Hungarian: felsőőri Pyrker János László; 2 November 1772 in Nagyláng, Soponya, near Székesfehérvár, Hungary – 2 December 1847 at Vienna) was a Hungarian Cistercian abbot, archbishop and poet.

== Life ==
He was descended from an old Hungarian noble family. His father was one of the eighteen hussars who distinguished themselves in the battle of Kunersdorf.

Graduated from Székesfehérvár and Pécs, he applied for a civil service position in Buda but was unsuccessful. In 1792 he entered the Cistercian chapter house at Lilienfeld Abbey, where he was ordained priest (1796). In quick succession he was steward, chancellor, prior, abbot, for a time, parish priest at Türnitz, and brought the monastery to prosperity.

He was appointed Bishop of Spiš (1818), Patriarch of Venice and Primate of Dalmatia with his see in Venice (1820), and finally Archbishop of Eger (1827). He founded health resorts in Karlovy Vary and Gastein for sick soldiers, a seminary for country school teachers at Eger, and donated 10,000 early florins toward the adornment of Eger Cathedral. His collection of paintings forms the basis of the Hungarian National Museum. For these charitable gifts he was knighted by the emperor with the title of Felsö-Eör. In 1827 he was founded a string quartet in Eger by his noble music instruments, one of these the 1697's Stradivari's violin, named Cecilia, newly discovered in 2011. He was known to the composer Franz Schubert who set two songs to his texts: D851 Das Heimweh and D852 Die Allmacht. Pyrker let it be known that he liked Schubert's D489 Der Wanderer, and was duly obliged with the dedication of Schubert's Opus 4.

== Works ==
Pyrker wrote dramatic, epic, and lyric poetry. His first dramatic work, "Historische Schauspiele", appeared in 1810, and contained three five-act tragedies: "Die Corvinen", "Karl der Kleine, König von Ungarn", and "Zrinis Tod". It was not considered worthy of discussion or criticism, and the various editions of his collected works do not contain the dramas.

The "Tunisias", an epic in twelve cantos, describing the conquest of Tunis by Emperor Charles V, appeared in 1820, and there have been frequent later editions. A sketch of a "Tunisias" with striking resemblances was found in the textbooks of the Jesuit Jacob Masen. It is possible that the Jesuit's textbook (Palæstra eloquentiæ) was used at the time of Pyrker's youth. Another epic, "Rudolphias", glorifies Rudolph, the first King from the House of Habsburg, and was printed in Vienna in 1824. Grillparzer dramatized the same material in his "Ottokars Glück und Ende", which has many similarities with the well-known "Ode to Habsburg" written by the Latin poet Nicola Avancini, S.J., probably read in the schools at the end of the eighteenth century.

Pyrker also wrote several short stories: "Die Perlen der heiligen Vorzeit" (1821); "Bilder aus dem Leben Jesu und der Apostel" and "Legenden der Heiligen auf alle Sonntage und Festtage des Jahres" (1842). As a lyric poet Pyrker published only a few monographs, e. g. "Lilienfelds Freude", and "Lieder der Sehnsucht nach den Alpen" (1845).
