= Henry Hottinger Collection =

American luthier

Hottinger Collection – formed in New York City by Henry Hottinger (4 February 1885 in New York, NY – 19 March 1979 in Stamford, CT).

Henry Hottinger was a founder and member of Wertheim & Co., a firm of Investment Bankers. Hottinger's interest in musical instruments led to him amassing what some regard as some of the best-known collection of rare violins of the mid-20th century.

Hottinger purchased his first violin, an Antonio Stradivari, in 1935. For his collection, he strove to find the most 'outstanding examples' of Cremonese masters, and in the case of Stradivari and Guarneri ‘del Gesù’, one example from each significant period of their production.

In 1967 an illustrated catalogue titled: R. Wurlitzer: The Henry Hottinger Collection was published following the collection's sale to Rembert Wurlitzer Co, one of the most well established string instrument dealerships of the time. 30 violins in all were subsequently dispersed across the world.

== Quotes ==
"...... One of the great violin collectors of all time." - Cozio.com
