= Zelnik István Southeast Asian Gold Museum =

Museum in Budapest, Hungary

Coordinates: 47.51218001680623°N 19.07292784138373°E

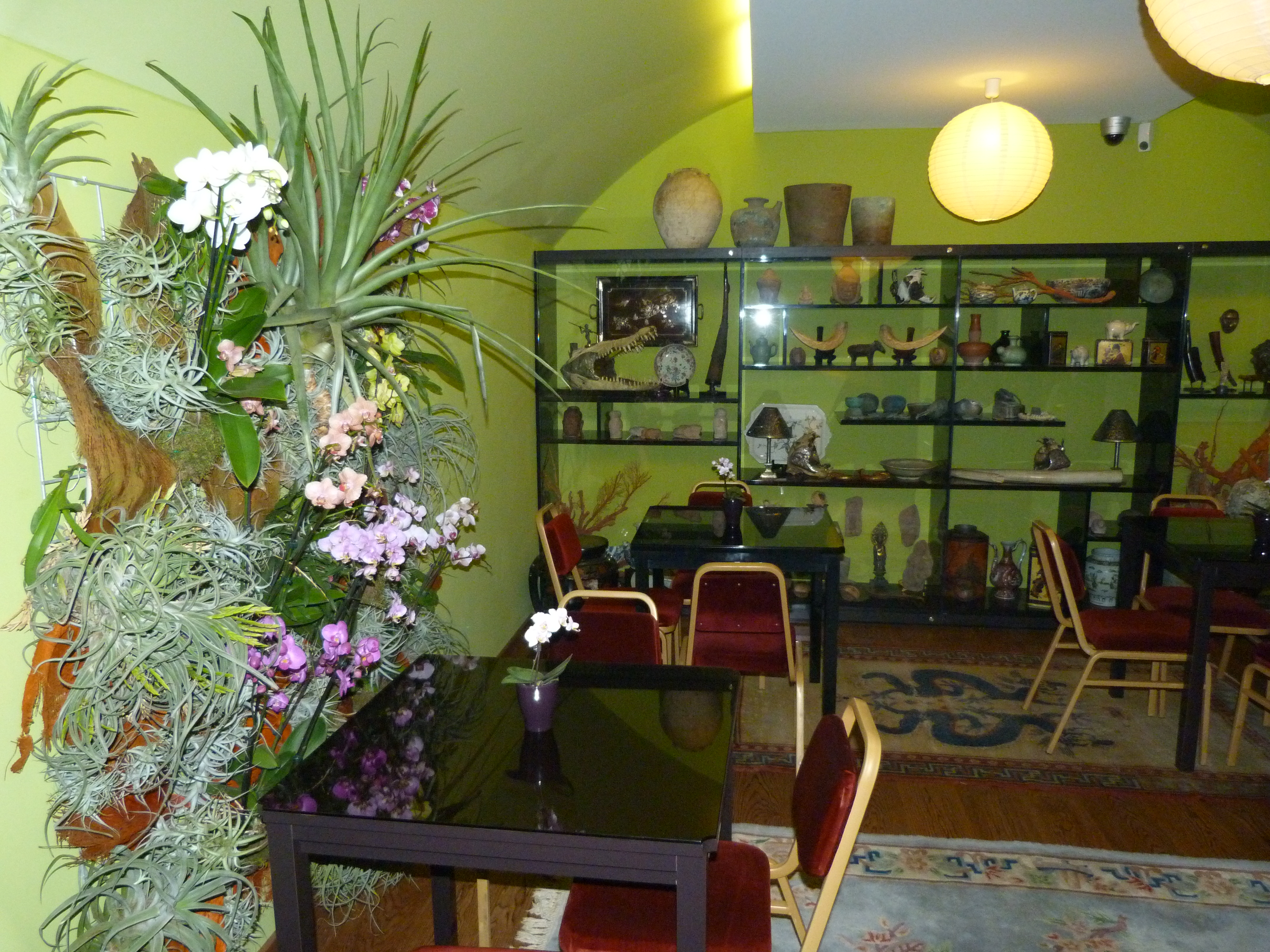
Interior of the museum

The Zelnik István Southeast Asian Gold Museum is a private museum located on Andrássy Street in the Terézváros district of Budapest, Hungary.

The Zelnik István Southeast Asian Gold Museum provides a home for nearly a thousand artifacts from eleven of the states of today's Southeast Asia. Most of these objects are of gold and date from prehistoric times to the 20th century, illustrating the spectrum of fine arts in Southeast Asia over the past two thousand years. The museum's material is founded on the collection of Dr. István Zelnik, a former diplomat in Vietnam and elsewhere, now a businessman and art collector. Of his assemblage of over 50,000 Southeast Asian artifacts, over 1,000 are on display at the museum. Within the museum it is the compilation of Southeast Asian precious metal (gold and silver) objects that are most striking from the historical and art-historical perspective, and from a collector's and a museological perspective the most extraordinary, including as it does the greatest number of curiosities, which are also valuable in monetary terms.

In addition to the treasures it displays, the Gold Museum presents the realms of culture and art in this colourful and multifaceted region. The museum halls lead the visitor across the eras of Southeast Asian art and its exceptional wealth, for this is a place where the cultures of both royal kingdoms and nomadic groups of people have flourished alongside one another. The culture and art of the region have been significantly influenced by that of neighbouring India and China, and other impulses have also arrived here along the trade routes that once wove across the territory (e.g. the maritime and mainland silk roads). The people of these lands have also been open and receptive to many religions, and animism, Hinduism and Buddhism thrived alongside one another.

The mainstays of the collection are the gold and silver artefacts from Cham, Khmer, Javanese and tribal cultures. The collection of gold masks surpasses that of the British Museum. The collection of religious objects, statues connected to Buddhism and Hinduism are also outstanding.

== Collection ==
The world religions of Buddhism and Hinduism are addressed in the hall and two further rooms on the ground floor of the museum. Representations connected to Buddhism can be found in all sections of the collection: Buddhas and Bodhisattvas (enlightened spiritual guides) present the cultic objects of the living religion of Buddhism through its cultural influences and the many aspects of material and form. Standing, sitting or walking Buddhas and the ‘thousand Buddha’ representations on the Buddha Wall are very important in the collection, but many articles of religious practice can also be seen, for example, a stupa-shaped reliquary, votive plates and ritual vessels.

Indian influences have affected the region's art significantly since the 5th century. The themes of Hindu art are almost entirely religious in nature, and the abundant and colourful world of the Hindu deities and a wealth of mythology offer an inexhaustible source of inspiration for representation. The most typical are the gods and goddesses who appear with a variety of forms and names, and also to some extent animal deities.

In the Hindu religion Shiva plays a central role, which the collection reflects perfectly. Almost all kingdoms and groups of people have represented Shiva in an artistic style that fitted their cultural concepts of kingdom and power because Shiva is the symbol of masculine creative energy and divine power.

The multicoloured character of the civilisations in the area have been enriched by Southeast Asia’s own trade network, which existed alongside the Central Asian Silk Road, that is, the ‘Maritime Silk Route’, and it was similarly important. Trade on these routes is shown in a separate exhibition hall, where the many distinctive goods it distributed can be seen, including gemstones, silk, porcelain and precious metal objects that changed hands within the trade network.

The upstairs halls of the museum house groups of objects that offer a view of the Cham, Khmer and Javanese court cultures, as well as the refined art of smithing in the tribal cultures of the mainland and the archipelago, mainly through gold objects. There is also a separate hall here dedicated to the Shiva sect within Hinduism because of the particular importance it gained in Southeast Asia. The influence of Islam from around the 12th–13th centuries can also be noted in various groups of objects.

In the Cham collection more of the so-called kosha—which were used to decorate or ‘dress’ linga (phallic symbols) in the worship of the god Shiva—can be seen, and in better condition, than in any other collection in the world. Cham statue jewellery: medals, rings, armlets, diadems and crowns also appear in matchless diversity. The multifaceted world of form, the mythological figures and the abundant floral ornamentation are particularly typical of the Cham smith's art, and clearly show the astoundingly high level of both artistry and technology. The collection of Cham silver statues is another uniquely rich source of iconographic plastic art, some of them have never been seen intact and in their full glory before. The inscribed Cham ritual vessels represent similar historic value and rarity. Secular jewellery forms a separate category in the museum that sometimes overlaps with that of statue jewellery.

The group of small sheets for ritual purposes, inscribed and decorated with figures or other representations, forms a subgroup within the Khmer collection. The Khmer jewellery compilation includes some outstandingly valuable and unique rarities, as does the group of small, everyday ritual objects such as small boxes, pots and storage vessels. Among these is a series that was originally of Khmer origin, but fell into the ownership of the Thai royal family. The collection of stone and metal moulds is also uniquely rare, and these are actually such a cultural and technological-historical curiosity that in most collections they are usually only noted as exceptions. Moreover, objects are also paired with the moulds that were used in their manufacture.

The collection of materials from tribal cultures presents some rarities, from human-shaped ritual objects likely to have been part of death or ancestral worships, through to the Bronze Age gold drum from the Dong Son culture and death masks, and on to the series of medals (plates) from Tanimbar. The tribal jewellery of the Indonesian Archipelago is both spectacular and unusual.

In addition to tribal artworks, court art in the Southeast Asian Archipelago is also richly represented in this collection through the early and rare precious metal plastic artwork of the Hindu-Buddhist era, as well as through the jewellery and clothing accessories of the Islamic court.

In the cultures of Southeast Asia the notion of ‘treasure’ has a deeper meaning. The ritual and high-art objects made from the most precious materials, gold and silver, sprang from the deepest teachings of religion because they were intended to make inner content and spiritual value apparent. Each of the artefacts placed in the Hall of Treasures was therefore considered a spiritual treasure.

Zelnik assembled his collection over 45 years, acquiring several collections in Canada and Western Europe. He admitted having brought many objects from Vietnam during his stay there as a diplomat in the 1970s, profiting from that special status. He protects the anonymity of the sellers, but refers to connections with families of royalty and the former French governor of Indochina. The financial value of the collection is estimated at $1.5 billion. Before opening the Gold Museum, Zelnik had contributed masks for an exhibition at the Ethnographic Museum in Budapest.

== Garden and Teahouse ==
The site of the museum also includes a tropical statue garden and an Asian Teahouse (in the former Rausch Villa). The exotic vegetation of the Sövény Aladár teahouse displays rare and unseen artefacts between its colourful orchids and tropical plants. These include silver-inlaid animal skulls, ancient giant seashells, coral encrusted 17th century blue and white Chinese export porcelains, and shipwrecked stone figures discovered in the Gulf of Siam.

== Reception ==
The Museum opened in September 2011. The Ministry of Culture approved the title of "collection" and "exhibition space" with conformance to local law which is legally not a museum, which would need higher professional standards.

Jean-François Hubert, a French specialist in the art of Vietnam, said at the opening of the Museum that it was the first such specialized museum since the establishment of the Musée Guimet in Paris in the nineteenth century.

== Dispute ==
In 2012 Cambodia filed a request for assistance from the United States concerning a 1,000 year old sandstone statute of a mythic warrior with an estimated value between $2 million and $3 million. The Cambodian government claims that legal processes were not followed when the statute was removed from the country. Zelnik Istvan, who owns the private collection on display in the museum told The New York Times: "There is no question the statue was looted in the final stages of the war. The best solution is that I purchase it for purposes of donation."

== Closing ==
The museum was closed at the beginning of 2013 and the collection was withdrawn from public presentation for financial reasons. Some further publications are released continuously on the artifacts of the collection. Its website and the teahouse are also closed. A collection of 80 objects, including gold bracelets and bowls, was bequeathed to the Hungarian National Museum. The pieces have been identified as Khmer but their provenance remains murky. Prak Sonnara, director of heritage at the Culture Ministry said: "We can’t evaluate how old or which temples they were taken from". According to Sonnara, experts at the Ministry will continue to the study the objects for further clues.
