= Stradivari Society =

Musical philanthropy organization

- Type: Private
- Industry: Music industry
- Founded: Chicago, Illinois, USA
- Founder: Geoffrey Fushi; Mary Galvin
- Headquarters: Chicago, Illinois, USA
- Area served: Worldwide
- Key people: Geoffrey Fushi, Chairman; Robert Bein, Advisor; Paige Ben-Dashan, Executive Director
- Services: Pedagogy
- Parent: Bein & Fushi, Inc.
- Website: The Stradivari Society

The Stradivari Society is a philanthropic organization based in Chicago, Illinois, best known for its arranging deals between owners of antique string instruments such as those made by luthiers Antonio Stradivari and Giuseppe Guarneri, for use by talented musicians and performers. The Stradivari Society does not hold title to the instruments.

== Background ==
The Society was founded by Geoffrey Fushi and Mary Galvin in 1985 when Galvin, wife of then-president of Motorola, Bob Galvin, was approached by Fushi and Robert Bein from Bein & Fushi of Chicago, to lend the Ruby Stradivarius of 1708 that he had previously sold to her to a promising violinist, Dylana Jenson. Seeing that such rare violins were very expensive and difficult to obtain, Galvin and Fushi designed the structure and name of the society after lending another violin when Dorothy DeLay of the Juilliard School asked Fushi for a violin for her most promising student, then ten-year-old Midori. Enjoying the experience of lending such beautiful violins to those who could use them to grow and launch their careers, a string of loans followed.

Awardees include Joshua Bell, Gil Shaham, Paul Huang, Yi-Jia Susanne Hou, Leila Josefowicz, Philippe Quint, Sarah Chang, Janine Jansen, Vadim Repin, Kristóf Baráti, Hilary Hahn, Maxim Vengerov, and Paul Coletti, all of whom have enhanced their careers playing violins the Society arranged for them to borrow.

== Loan program ==
The Society's two dozen patrons are each given tri-annual concerts by their sponsored musician during its three-year period. Each artist is responsible for insuring the instrument, and its delivery to the workshop of Bein and Fushi. Inspection and service is performed exclusively by Bein and Fushi three times yearly, and cannot be done by any other luthier without permission. The instrument is often purchased by the artist from its patron, with The Society acting as liaison.

=== Recipients ===
Antonio Stradivari

- Philippe Quint - Ruby, 1708
- Clara Jumi Kang - ex-Strauss, ca. 1708
- Vadim Gluzman – Auer, 1689
- Kristóf Baráti - Lady Harmsworth, 1703
- Augustin Hadelich – Kiesewetter, ca.. 1723
- Cecily Ward – Fleming, 1681
- Rugerro Allifranchini – Fetzer, 1694
- Gil Shaham – Comtesse de Polignac, 1699
- Frank Almond – Dushkin, 1701
- Berent Korfker – King Maximilian Joseph, ca. 1702
- Stefan Milenkovich – Lyall, 1702
- Tamaki Kawakubo – La Cathédrale, 1707
- Jeff Thayer – Burstein; Bagshawe, 1708
- Joshua Bell – Tom Taylor, 1732
- Janine Jansen – Barrere, 1727

Giuseppe Guarneri del Gesù

- William Hagen - Sennhauser, ca. 1735
- Paul Huang - ex-Wieniawski, ca. 1742
- Francisco Fullana - Mary Portman, ca. 1735
- Stephen Kim - Moller, cs. 1725

Other

- Joshua Brown - Pietro Guarneri, 1679
- Stephen Waarts - Pietro Guarneri II of Venice, ca. 1750
- Tim Fain - Francesco Gobetti Venice, ca. 1717
- Sandy Cameron - Pietro Guarneri of Venice, ca. 1735
- Elena Urioste - Alessandro Gagliano, ca. 1706
- Kenneth Liao - Nicolò Amati, ca. 1635–40
- Gao Can - Nicolò Amati Lobkowicz 1617
- Jonathon Moerschal – Gasparo da Saló, "Adam", 1590 (viola)
- Yang Lie - Guarneri School of Cremona. ca. 1740
- Tom Stone Jr. – Tonge; Scheinin, Carlo Bergonzi, ca. 1733
- Jisun Yang – Nicolò Gagliano, ca. 1750
- Richard Hirschl – Ferdinando Garimberti, 1923 (cello)
- Michala Høj – Robert Chen, Matteo Goffriller, ca. 1700
- Jason Issokson – Pietro Guarneri, ca. 1679
- Yang Liu – Guarnerius, ca. 1740
- Hanbin Yoo – Giovanni Paolo Maggini, ca. 1600
- Tai Murray – Petrius Merighi, 1772
- Masha Lakisova – Taylor, Giovanni Francesco Pressenda 1845

== See also ==
- Stradivarius
- John & Arthur Beare
- Machold Rare Violins
- List of Stradivarius instruments
