= Bein & Fushi =

Instrument shop in Chicago, US

Bein & Fushi, Inc. is a stringed instrument dealership and repair shop in Chicago founded in 1976, known internationally for its dealership of antique string instruments such as those made by luthiers Antonio Stradivari and Giuseppe Guarneri. Bein & Fushi includes the Stradivari Society, known for lending rare violins to young aspiring artists.

== History and background ==
Robert Bein and Geoffrey Fushi established Bein & Fushi, Inc. in 1976. Since its inception, the shop has arranged deals for the sale of violins, violas, cellos, and bows by well-known luthiers such as Antonio Stradivari, Giuseppe Guarneri del Gesù, Nicola Amati, Antonio Amati, Carlo Bergonzi, François Xavier Tourte, Giovanni Guadagnini, Alessandro Gagliano, Santo Serafin, Gasparo da Salò, Francesco Rugeri, and Dominique Peccatte, as well as modern luthiers.

In 1985, Geoffrey Fushi and Mary Galvin founded the Stradivari Society to support young virtuosos by loaning rare instruments. The shop is located in Chicago's Fine Arts Building.

Notable clients have included Ruggiero Ricci, Yo-Yo Ma, Itzhak Perlman, Gidon Kremer, Lynn Harrell, Joshua Bell, Gil Shaham, Anne-Sophie Mutter, Isaac Stern, Yehudi Menuhin, Nigel Kennedy, and James Ehnes.

== Notable instruments ==
Bein & Fushi has managed the dealership of and has held the following notable instruments, among others:

- Berger Stradivarius (1700 vioin)
- Cobbett Stradivarius (1683 violin)
- Domenico Montagnana (1749, 1733 cellos)
- Earl Falmouth Stradivarius
- General Kyd Stradivarius (1714 violin)
- Harrison Stradivarius (1693 violin)
- Kiesewetter Stradivarius (1723 violin)
- King Joseph Gaurneri (1737 violin)
- Lord Dunn-Raven Stradivarius
- Rivaz Stradivarius (1707 violin)
- Ruby Stradivarius (1708 violin)
- Tom Taylor Stradivarius (1732 violin)
- Vieuxtemps Guarneri (1741 violin)
- Venus Stradivarius (1727 violin)
- Wilemotte Stradivarius (1734 violin)

== See also ==
- John & Arthur Beare
- Machold Rare Violins
- Luigi Tarisio
- List of Stradivarius instruments
