= Vieuxtemps =

Vieuxtemps may refer to:

- Henri Vieuxtemps (1820–1881), Belgian composer and violinist
- Paul Vieuxtemps (born 1999), Thai skier
- Vieuxtemps Guarneri, a violin built by Giuseppe Guarneri c. 1741
