= Susanne Hou =

Canadian violinist

Yi-Jia Susanne Hou
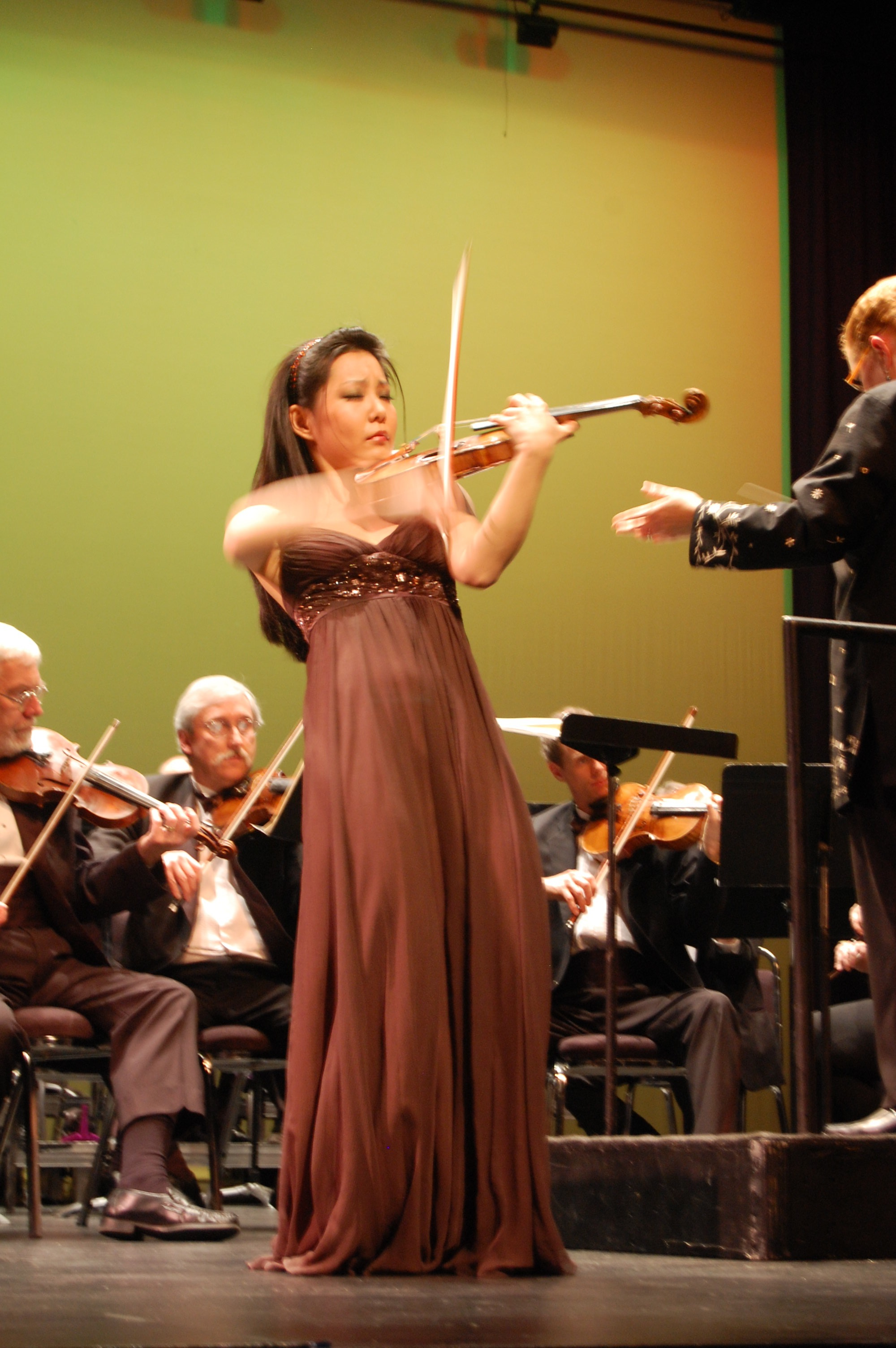
- Hou performing with the Okanagan Symphony Orchestra, April 2009
- Born: 9 December 1977 (age 48); Shanghai, China
- Occupation: Violinist
- Parent: Alec Hou (musician)
- Website: www.susannehou.com

Yi-Jia Susanne Hou (Chinese: 侯以嘉; pinyin: Hóu Yǐjiā, b. 9 December 1977 (age 48), Shanghai, China) is a Canadian violinist.

== Biography ==
Born in Shanghai and raised in Mississauga, Hou grew up in a musical family. At the age of nine, she studied at the Royal Conservatory of Music. She went on to attend the Juilliard School where she studied with Dorothy DeLay, Naoko Tanaka, and Cho-Liang Lin. At Juilliard, she completed BM and MM music degrees and received an Artist Diploma.

By age 17, she had performed Paganini's Twenty-four Caprices for Solo Violin in Toronto and Aspen. She has also performed all ten of Beethoven's piano and violin sonatas in New York as well as the complete collection of Brahms' violin and piano sonatas and piano trios. Hou continues to perform as an international soloist and has recorded the Sibelius Violin Concerto and short works by Sarasate on her CD Fire & Ice with the Slovenia Radiotelevision Symphony Orchestra among other recordings.

She earned three gold medals with unanimous decisions at international violin competitions: the Concours International Marguerite Long-Jacques Thibaud (France, 1999), the Rodolfo Lipizer International Violin Competition (Italy, 1999), and the Pablo Sarasate International Violin Competition (Spain, 1997).

She won first place in the Canadian Music Competition for three consecutive years, the Juilliard Dvořák Concerto Competition, the Juilliard-Lehigh Valley Chamber Orchestra Competition, and the F. Nakamichi Sibelius Violin Competition at the Aspen Music Festival.

Hou was awarded the loan of the 1729 "ex-Heath" Guarneri del Gesu violin by the Canada Council for the Arts Musical Instrument Bank competition. She is the first ever violinist to earn first place twice and to earn both consecutively (in 2003 and 2006). In 2003, the instrument was valued at US$2.75 million. Her violin bow was made by her father, Alec Hou.

On Christmas Day, 2006, Susanne performed for the first time together with her father in Shanghai. The orchestral performance, which featured Susanne as a soloist and Alec as the conductor, was the focus of a CBC The National documentary titled Return to Shanghai. It aired in May 2007 on CBC television.

In 2009, Hou was granted the use of the 1735 "ex-Mary Portman, Fritz Kreisler Giuseppe Guarneri del Gesù, Cremona" by the Stradivari Society of Chicago. The historic violin was once owned and bowed by Fritz Kreisler.

Hou's music video "The Devil's Delight", produced by Rhombus Media, premiered on Bravo!TV in 2010; she also stars in a documentary on the "Canada Council Instrument Bank", produced by Rotating Planet and directed by Ari Cohen for Bravo!. She performed the violin solo in the Atom Egoyan film Adoration that won the Ecumenical Jury Prize at Festival de Cannes, featuring music composed by Mychael Danna.

On November 27, 2013, Hou used the Kreisler violin to record Beethoven's Violin Concerto in D Major, Op. 61 (1806) with the London Symphony Orchestra. Hou chose the music as a "tribute" to Beethoven, Kreisler, and her parents Alec and Yvonne Hou. The concerto, with Kreisler's cadenzas, was the same music that her father Alec performed the night she was born. The London recording was filmed for a documentary by Toronto's Know Rules Media in association with UK's HiBROW production company. The film is expected to explore the violin's nearly 300-year history, including how it ended up in Hou's hands.

Sir Yehudi Menuhin referred to Hou as "absolutely phenomenal … one of the greatest young talents of the future", and Jean-Jacques Kantorow, member of the jury in the Concours International Marguerite Long-Jacques Thibaud said, "By the final round of the competition, Ms. Hou had the entire jury at her feet."

== Awards ==
- Winner, Canada Council for the Arts Instrument Bank Competition (Canada, 2003, 2006)
- Gold Medal, Concours International Marguerite Long-Jacques Thibaud (France, 1999)
- Gold Medal, Rodolfo Lipizer International Violin Competition (Italy, 1999)
- Gold Medal, Pablo Sarasate International Violin Competition (Spain, 1997)
- First Prize, Juilliard Dvořák Concerto Competition
- First Prize, Juilliard-Lehigh Valley Chamber Orchestra Competition
- First Prize, F. Nakamichi Sibelius Violin Competition at the Aspen Music Festival

== Discography ==
- you can never have too many suites (2008), including de Falla's Suite of Spanish Folk Songs, Shostakovich's Four Preludes, Kreisler's Liebesfreud, Schön's Rosmarin & Syncopation, Yang Wong Luo Bin's Suite of Folksongs & Dances, Tang's New Face of my Motherland, and Li Ci's Li Flower.
- Fantasy (2007): Schubert's Fantasia and Ave Maria, Gounod's Faust and Sarasate's Faust Fantasy
- Chen Yi (2003): Momentum / Shui, Lin, Hou, Marshall, Singapore SO
- Fire & Ice (2000): Sibelius' Violin Concerto and shorter works by Sarasate
