= Lord Wilton =

Guarneri violin

The Lord Wilton Guarnerius, sometimes called the ex-Yehudi Menuhin, is an antique and valuable violin fabricated by Italian luthier Bartolomeo Giuseppe "del Gesù" Guarneri (1698–1744), usually called Guarneri del Gesù. The violin was made in 1742 in the city of Cremona. It was named after Seymour Egerton, 4th Earl of Wilton, a musician, associate of Arthur Sullivan, and 19th century owner of the instrument. It was owned and played by the celebrated violinist Yehudi Menuhin from 1978 to 1999. After Menuhin's death in 1999, the instrument was sold for US$6 million to the collector, David L. Fulton, the highest price paid for a violin to that date.

As of 2015, the instrument remains in Fulton's possession. Zlatko Balokovic also played the instrument from 1952 to 1961.
