= Kiesewetter =

Kiesewetter is a German surname. Notable people with the surname include:

- André Kiesewetter (born 1969), German ski jumper
- Craig Kieswetter (born 1987), England cricketer
- Jerome Kiesewetter (born 1993), German-American soccer player
- Knut Kiesewetter (1941–2016), German jazz musician, singer, songwriter and producer
- Michéle Kiesewetter (1984–2007), German police officer killed by Neo-nazi terrorists
- Peter Kiesewetter (1945–2012), German modern classical composer
- Roderich Kiesewetter (born 1963), German politician

== See also ==
- Kiesewetter Stradivarius (c. 1723), antique violin fabricated by Italian luthier Antonio Stradivari of Cremona
