= Violin Concerto No. 4 =

Violin Concerto No. 4 may refer to:

- Violin Concerto No. 4 (Haydn) in G major
- Violin Concerto No. 4 (Mozart) in D major
- Violin Concerto No. 4 (Paganini) in D minor
- Violin Concerto No. 4 (Schnittke)
- Violin Concerto No. 4 (Vieuxtemps) in D minor, a composition by Henri Vieuxtemps

== See also ==
- List of compositions for violin and orchestra
- Violin Concerto
