= Augustin Hadelich =

Italian-German-American violinist (born 1984)

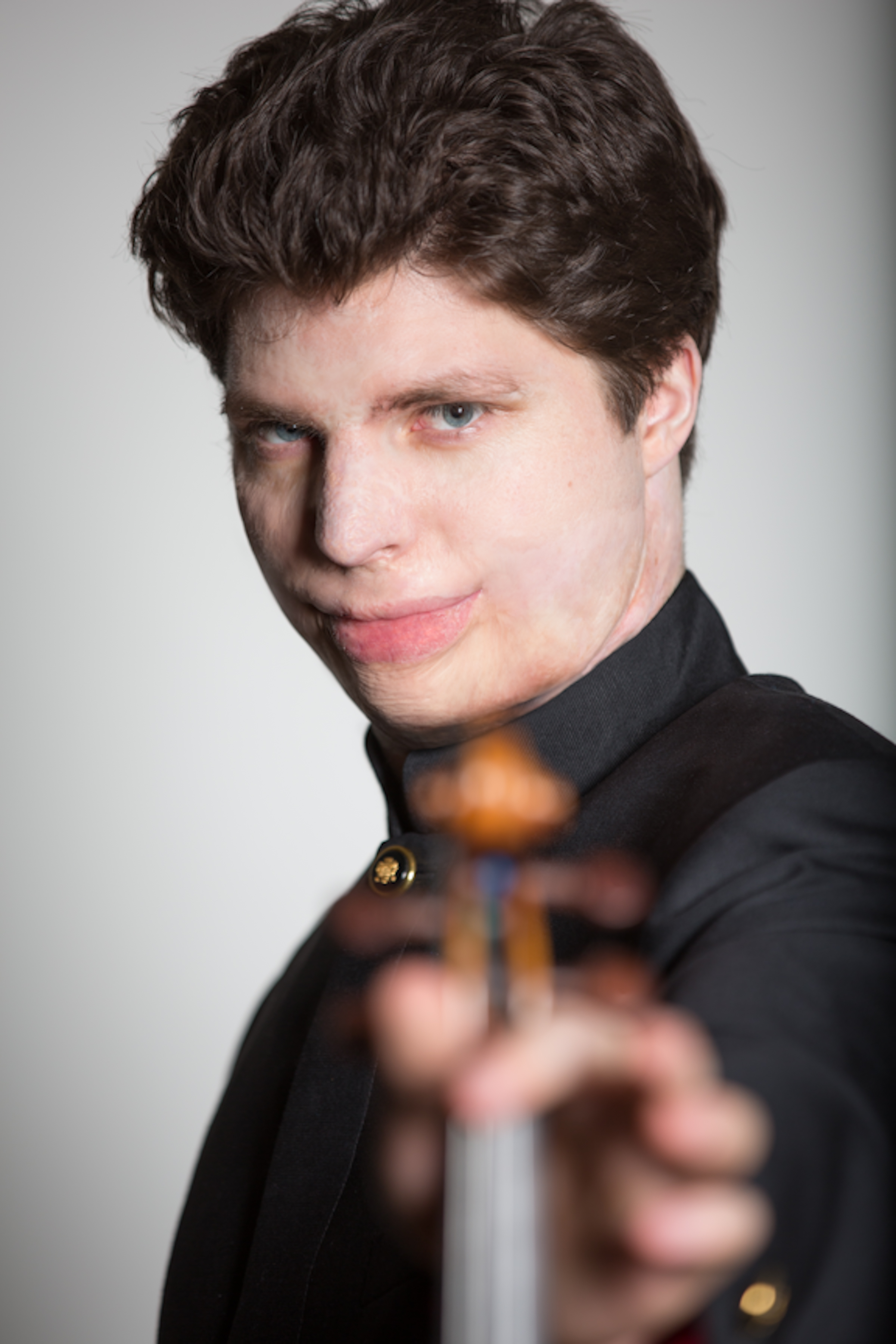
- Hadelich in 2012

Background information
- Born: April 4, 1984 (age 42); Cecina, Tuscany, Italy
- Genre: Classical
- Occupation: Violinist
- Instrument: "Leduc / Szeryng" Guarneri del Gesu violin
- Labels: Warner Classics, AVIE, Naxos
- Website: augustinhadelich.com/en

Augustin Hadelich (born April 4, 1984) is an Italian-German-American Grammy-winning classical violinist.

== Early life and education ==
Augustin Hadelich was born in Cecina, Italy, to German parents. His two older brothers were already playing cello and piano when Hadelich (age 5) began his studies on the violin with his father, an agriculturalist and amateur cellist. In his early musical development, Hadelich progressed in his studies through irregular lessons and masterclasses from violinists traveling near the Hadelich farm in rural Tuscany, including Uto Ughi, Christoph Poppen, Igor Ozim, and Norbert Brainin. Hadelich enjoyed a blossoming career as a wunderkind violinist, pianist, and composer in Germany.

In 1999, Hadelich was injured in a fire on his family's farm in Italy, and was airlifted to be treated in Germany. After his recovery, Hadelich graduated summa cum laude from the Istituto Mascagni in Livorno, Italy, and successfully auditioned for admission to The Juilliard School.

From 2004 to 2007, Hadelich studied at Juilliard with Joel Smirnoff, graduating with a graduate diploma (2005) and an artist diploma (2007). After graduating, Hadelich continued to make his home in New York and became an American citizen in 2014, playing "America the Beautiful" at his naturalization ceremony.

== Career ==
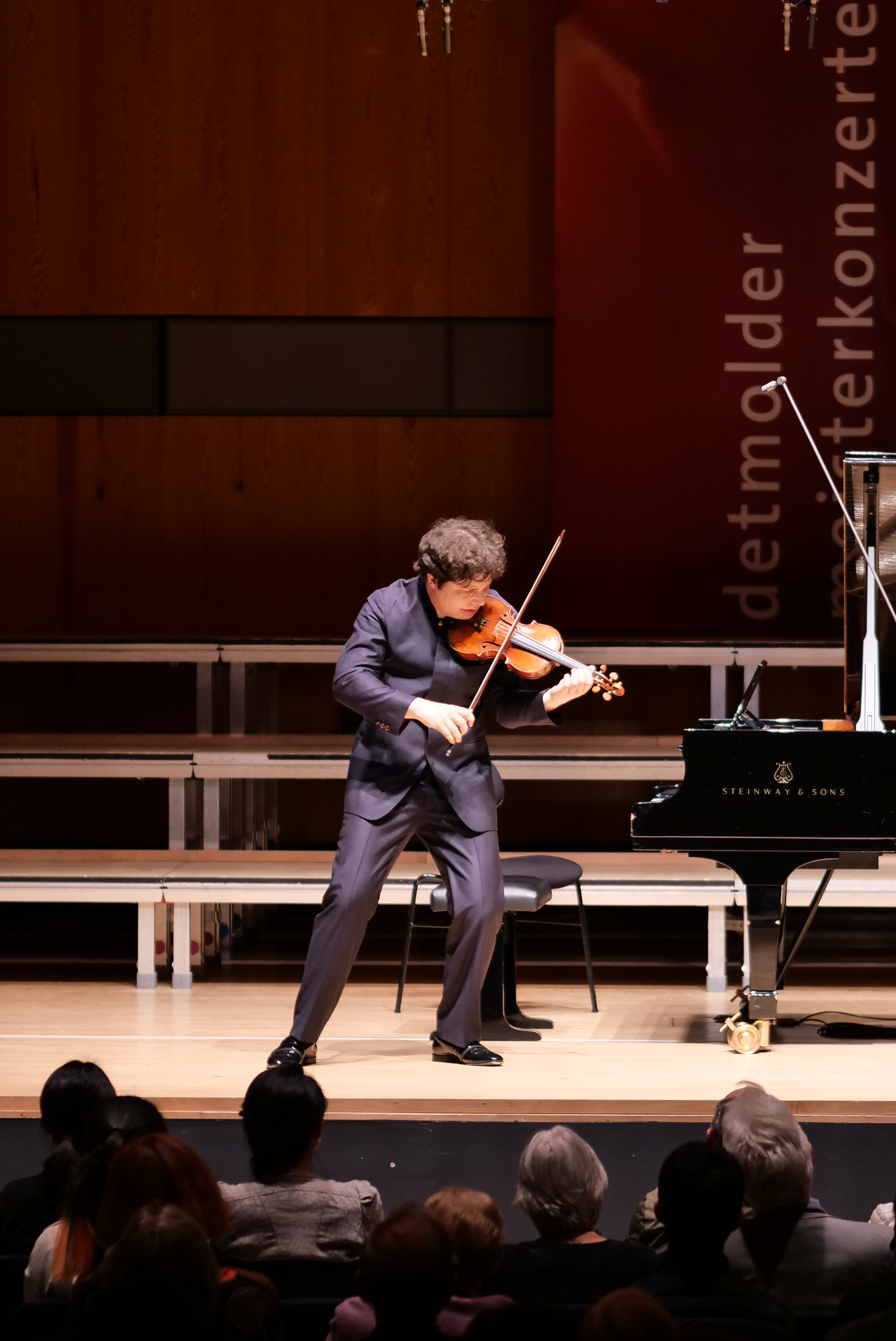
Hadelich performing in Germany, 2022

Shortly after winning first prize at the International Violin Competition of Indianapolis in 2006, Hadelich proved himself ready for the world stage through several short-notice substitutions with major orchestras. In 2008 he filled in for Julian Rachlin at the Hollywood Bowl, performing with the Los Angeles Philharmonic. In 2010, Hadelich made his New York Philharmonic debut at the Bravo! Vail Festival substituting for violinist Nikolaj Znaider.

In the following decade he returned to the Los Angeles Philharmonic and the New York Philharmonic numerous times and performed with all other major orchestras in North America, such as the Boston Symphony, Pittsburgh Symphony Orchestra, Cleveland Orchestra, Chicago Symphony, Philadelphia Orchestra, San Francisco Symphony, and the symphony orchestras of Atlanta, Baltimore, Cincinnati, Dallas, Detroit, Florida, Houston, Madison, Milwaukee, Minnesota, Montréal, Oregon, Seattle, St. Louis, Toronto, Utah, and Vancouver. Internationally, Hadelich has played with the BBC Symphony Orchestra, Bavarian Radio Symphony Orchestra, Berlin Philharmonic, WDR Symphony Orchestra, Czech Philharmonic, Leipzig Gewandhaus Orchestra, London Philharmonic Orchestra, Royal Concertgebouw Orchestra (Amsterdam), Danish National Symphony Orchestra, Finnish Radio Symphony Orchestra, Vienna Symphony, Spanish National Orchestra, Sydney Symphony, NHK Symphony Orchestra (Tokyo), Hong Kong Philharmonic Orchestra, and Seoul Philharmonic Orchestra.

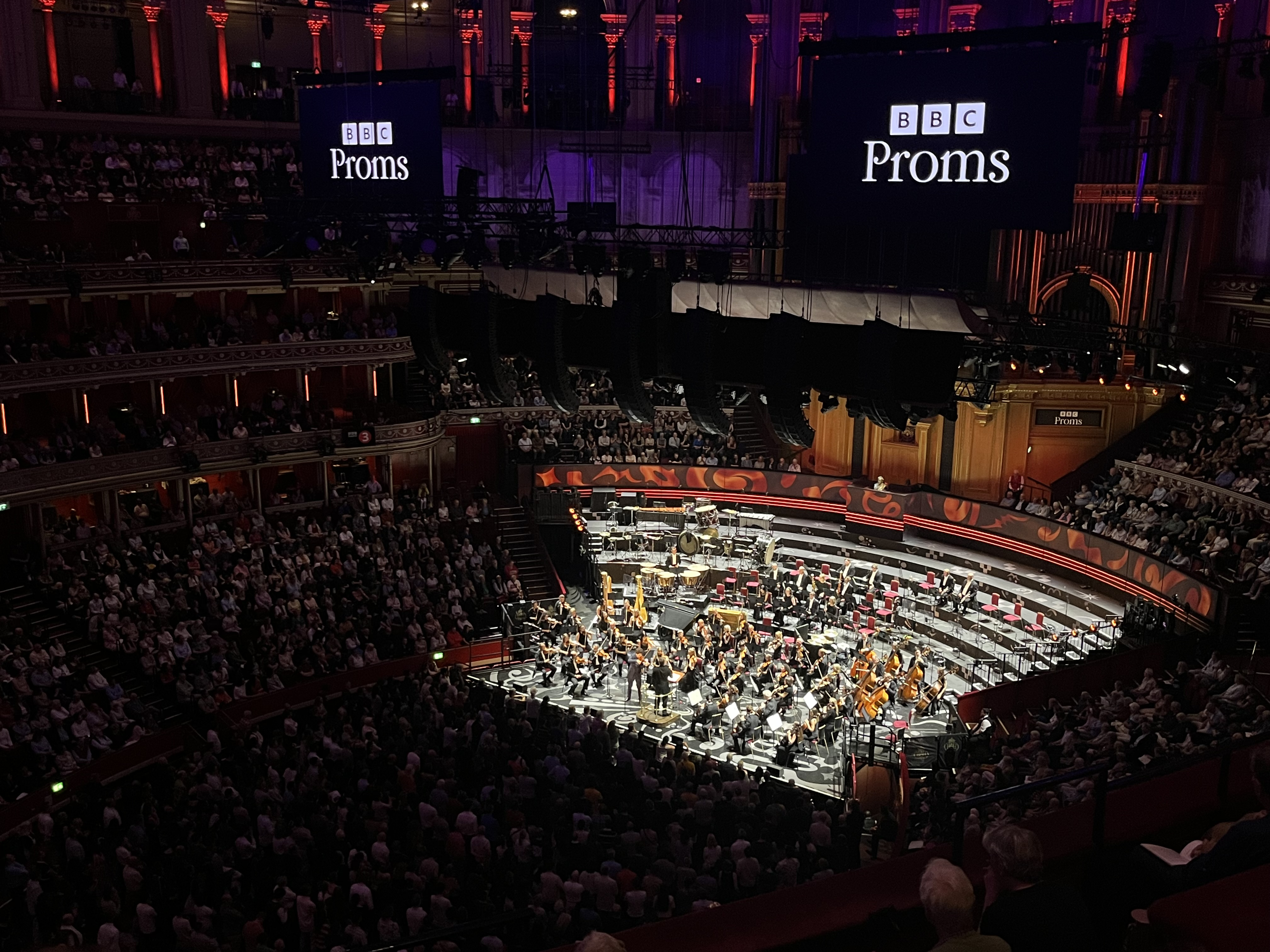
Augustin with the BBC Symphony Orchestra at the Royal Albert Hall

From 2019 to 2023 he was Artist in Association with the NDR Elbphilharmonie Orchestra in Hamburg.

Hadelich is known to perform a wide range of repertoire. Although he is often scheduled to perform from the standard violin concerto repertoire (Beethoven, Brahms, Sibelius, Tchaikovsky, etc.), he is also a champion of contemporary works, such as the violin concertos by Thomas Adès, Henri Dutilleux, György Ligeti, and recital works by Brett Dean, Stephen Hartke, David Lang, György Kurtag, Coleridge-Taylor Perkinson, Daniel Bernard Roumain, Toru Takemitsu, and Bernd Alois Zimmermann.

== Awards and accolades ==
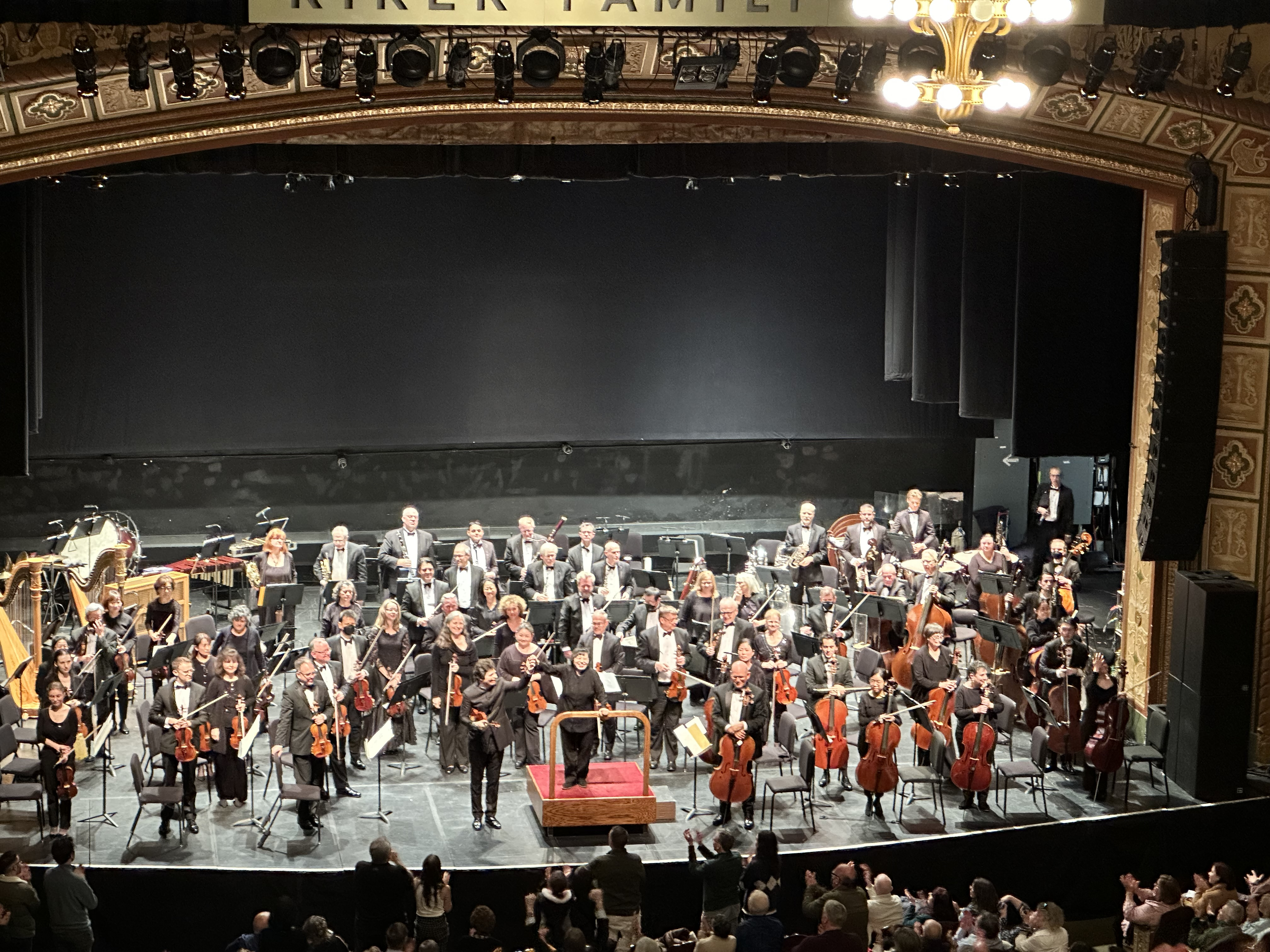
Hadelich at end of a performance of Beethoven's Violin Concerto in D major with Xian Zhang and the New Jersey Symphony, 2024

Augustin Hadelich is the winner of a 2021 Opus Klassik "Instrumentalist of the Year" award.

In 2018, Hadelich was named "Instrumentalist of the Year" by Musical America.

In December 2017, Hadelich was awarded an honorary doctorate from the University of Exeter in the UK.

In February 2016, Hadelich won his first Grammy Award for the Best Classical Instrumental Solo category at the 58th Grammy Awards in Los Angeles for his performance of Henri Dutilleux’s Violin Concerto, ‘L'arbre des songes’, with the Seattle Symphony and music director Ludovic Morlot on the Seattle Symphony Media label.

In October 2015, Hadelich became the inaugural winner of the Warner Music Prize, which includes a grant of $100,000 and a recording opportunity with Warner Classics.

Hadelich won the gold medal at the 2006 International Violin Competition of Indianapolis, where he also received several additional accolades, including the best performance of a Romantic concerto, Classical concerto, Beethoven sonata, violin sonata other than Beethoven, Bach work, commissioned work, encore piece, and Paganini caprice.

Hadelich has also received an Avery Fisher Career Grant (2009), a Borletti-Buitoni Trust Fellowship (2011), and Lincoln Center’s Martin E. Segal Award (2012).

== Instrument ==
Hadelich currently plays the 1744 "Leduc / Szeryng" Guarneri del Gesu lent to him through the Tarisio Trust for an extended period.

Hadelich previously played the 1723 Kiesewetter Stradivarius violin, which was on loan from Clement and Karen Arrison through the Stradivari Society of Chicago.

From October 2006 until August 2010, Hadelich played the 1683 "ex-Gingold" Stradivari as the standing first-prize winner of the Indianapolis Competition.

== Teaching ==
In 2021, Augustin Hadelich was appointed to the faculty of the Yale School of Music (YSM), where he teaches a limited number of violinists and gives master classes for all YSM string players. He has also held teaching residencies at the Colburn School, Curtis Institute of Music, and Kronberg Academy and given master classes at the Aspen Music Festival and School, the University of Cincinnati’s College-Conservatory of Music, Indiana University’s Jacobs School of Music, the San Francisco Conservatory of Music, the Manhattan School of Music, and the University of Music and Performing Arts in Munich.

== Discography ==
- Warner Classics – American Road Trip – works by Amy Beach, Charles Ives, Aaron Copland, Daniel Bernard Roumain, Howdy Forrester/Augustin Hadelich, Stephen Hartke, Coleridge-Taylor Perkinson, Manuel Ponce/Jasha Heifetz, John Adams, Leonard Bernstein – with Orion Weiss (piano), 2024
- Warner Classics – Recuerdos – works by Pablo de Sarasate, Sergei Prokofiev, Benjamin Britten, Francisco Tarrega – WDR Symphony Orchestra Cologne, Cristian Macelaru, 2022
- Warner Classics – Bach Sonatas & Partitas, 2021 – Nominated, 2022 Grammy Awards
- Warner Classics – Bohemian Tales – Violin Concerto (Dvořák), works by Antonín Dvorák, Leos Janácek, Josef Suk – Bavarian Radio Symphony Orchestra, Jakub Hrůša (conductor), 2020 – Nominated, 2021 Grammy Awards; Winner, Opus Klassik 2021
- Warner Classics – Brahms and Ligeti Violin Concertos – Norwegian Radio Orchestra, Miguel Harth-Bedoya (conductor), Recorded 2017/2018, released 2019
- Warner Classics – Paganini, 24 Caprices for solo violin, 2018
- Cantaloupe Music – David Lang, "Mystery Sonatas", 2018
- London Philharmonic – Tchaikovsky, Violin Concerto / Lalo, Symphonie Espagnole – London Philharmonic Orchestra, Vasily Petrenko (cond.), Omer Meir Wellber (cond.), 2017
- Avie – works by Franck / Kurtág / Previn / Schumann – with Joyce Yang, piano, 2016 – Nominated, 2017 Grammy Awards
- Avie – Bartók, Violin Concerto No. 2 / Mendelssohn, Violin Concerto – Norwegian Radio Orchestra, Miguel Harth-Bedoya (conductor), 2015
- Avie – Sibelius, Violin Concerto / Thomas Adès, Violin Concerto (Concentric Paths) with Royal Liverpool Philharmonic and Hannu Lintu, 2014 – Nominated for Gramophone Award
- Avie – Histoire du Tango: works by Piazzolla / De Falla / Paganini / Sarasate – with Pablo Sáinz Villegas, guitar, 2013
- Avie – Echoes of Paris: works by Poulenc / Stravinsky / Debussy / Prokofiev – with Robert Kulek, piano, 2011 – Gramophone Magazine “Editor’s Choice”
- Avie – Flying Solo: works by Bartók / Paganini / Ysaÿe / Zimmerman, 2009
- Naxos – Haydn, complete violin concertos with Cologne Chamber Orchestra, 2008
- Naxos – Telemann, 12 Fantasias for solo violin, 2007
