= Catarina Guarneri =

- Born: Katarina Rota c. 1699; Vienna, Austria
- Died: c. 1748
- Occupation: Luthier
- Known for: Violin maker

Catarina Guarneri (c. 1699 – c. 1748), also known as Katarina Rota prior to marriage, was the wife of luthier Giuseppe Guarneri, and a suspected luthier in her own right. Accounts handed down from Carlo Bergonzi II, the grandson of Giuseppe Guarneri, provide evidence that Catarina Guarneri assisted her husband in his work.

== Early life and marriage ==
Catarina Guarneri was born Katarina Rota in Vienna, but her name is recorded as Catarina on several documents. It is suspected Rota moved to Cremona with the Imperial Austrian army around 1707 onward.

In 1722, Rota was married to Giuseppe Guarneri, the grandson of Andrea Guarneri and from a long line of violin makers. Katarina Rota became Catarina Guarneri, moving into a house in the centre of Cremona with her husband, who lived with his family until marriage.

== Violin making ==
There is evidence which shows that Catarina Guarneri assisted her husband in his shop, with violin connoisseur Giovanni de Piccolellis mentioning a "Caterina Guarneri" who supposedly assisted the Guarneri's. de Piccolellis also stated that Catarina Guarneri was known for the manuscript labels found inside her violins, and there are many records of instruments containing tickets or labels with her name on them.

Horace Petherick, a violin connoisseur, wrote in one of his books about a viola he inspected in London. He said the viola had a ticket inside with the inscription "Katarina Guarneria fecit Cremone anno 1749". A dealer present also said he had come across two violins with similar tickets. A violin maker from Prague, B. Lanter, is also said to have owned a viola bearing the label "Cat. Guarneri's". Additional suspected labels include a violin in Budapest with a label reading "Katharina Guarneri fecit Cremone anno 1730". It is not confirmed whether any of these labels are authentic, but their existence is notable.

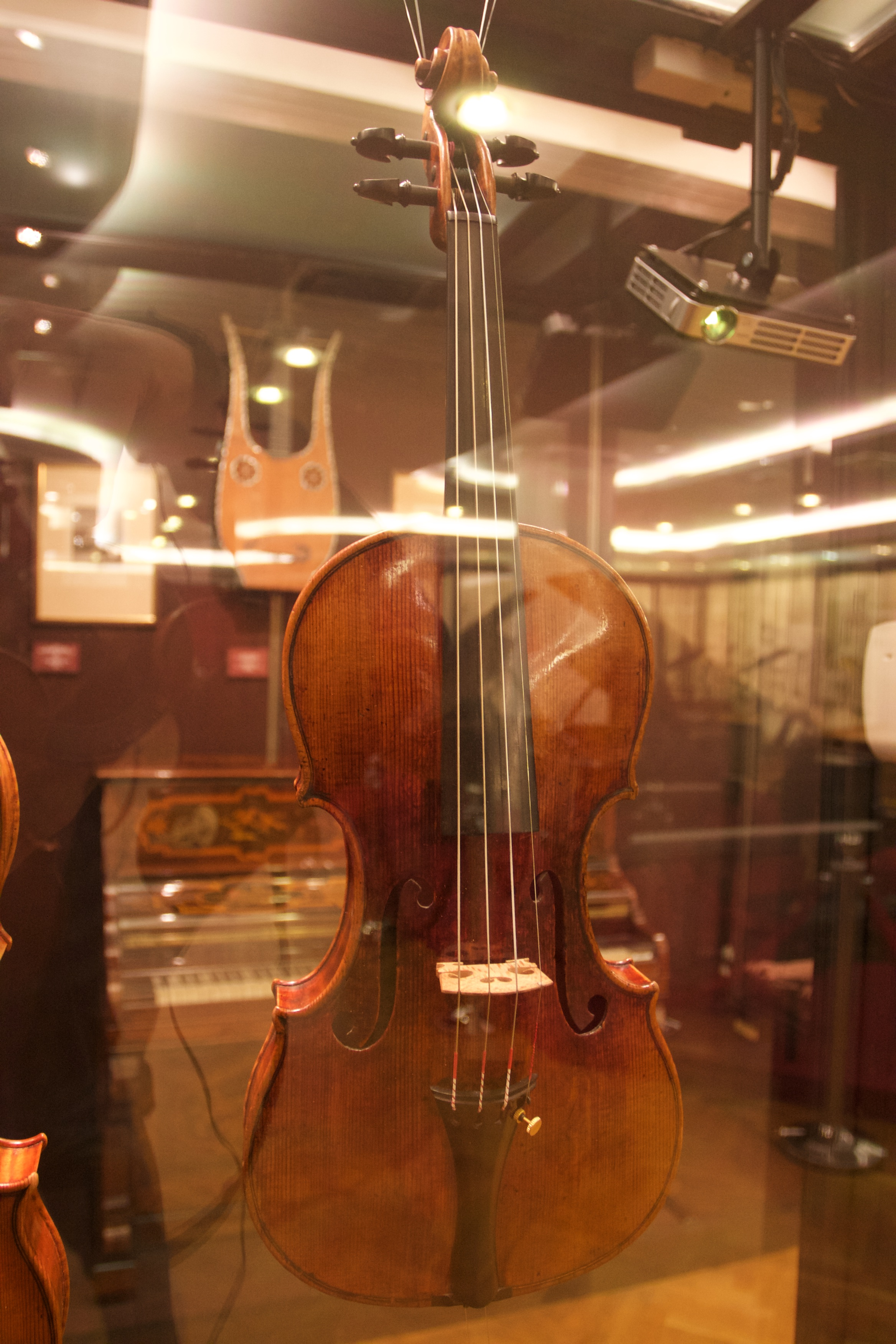
A Guarneri violin created in 1742, when Catarina may have assisted her husband in his later life

== After Giuseppe's death ==
Unusual stylistic differences in Giuseppe Guarneri's work were noted towards the end of his life. These are usually attributed to sons or apprentices, however Giuseppe Guarneri had neither.

After Giuseppe's death in 1744, many speculate that Catarina Guarneri finished making some partly-finished violins to bring in some income. This theory is supported by the 1745 label of the Leduc violin, which posthumously credits Giuseppe.

Catarina remained in Cremona until 1748, when she remarried and became Katarina Horak.
