= Zlatko Baloković =

Croatian violinist (1895–1965)

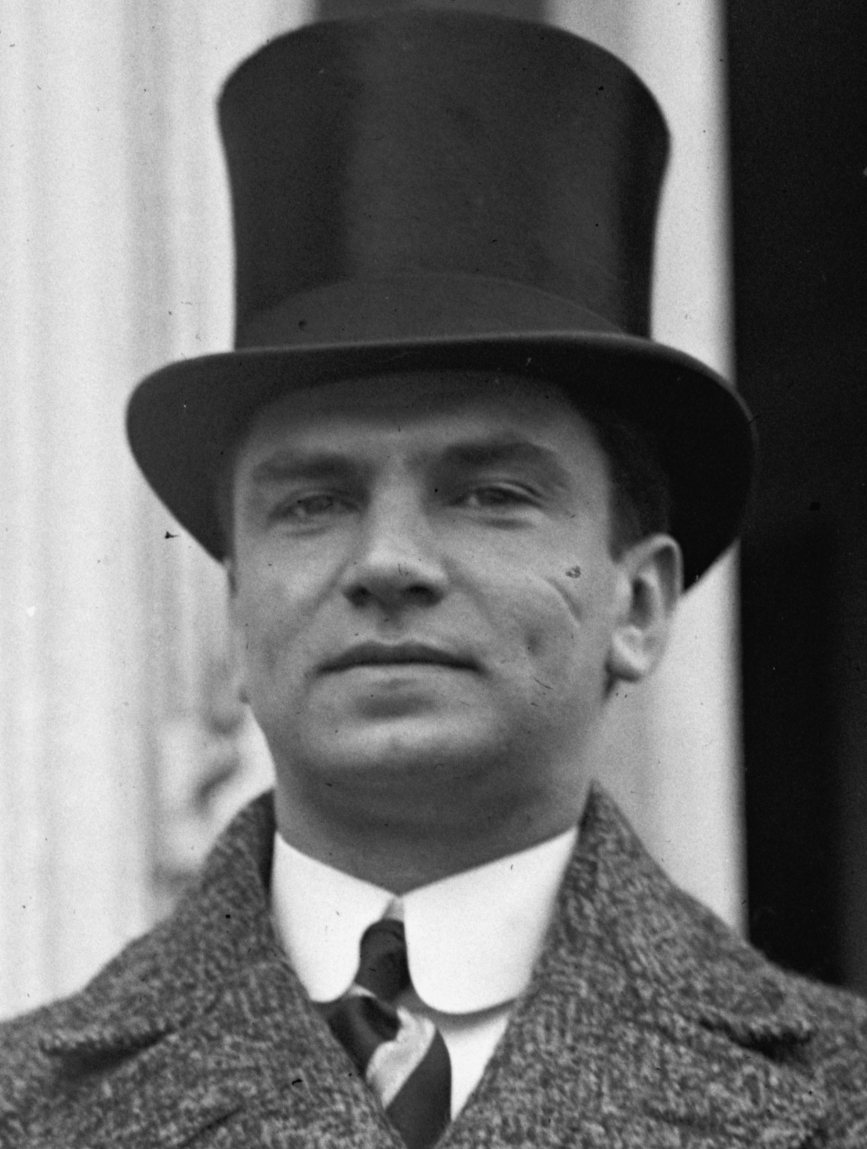
- Zlatko Baloković in 1925

Background information
- Born: March 31, 1895; Zagreb, Kingdom of Croatia-Slavonia, Austria-Hungary
- Died: March 29, 1965 (aged 69) Venice, Italy
- Occupation: Violinist
- Instrument: Violin

Zlatko Baloković (March 31, 1895 – March 29, 1965) was a Croatian violinist.

== Early years ==
He was born in Zagreb, Croatia (at the time part of Austria-Hungary), and began violin lessons at age ten. He made such progress that, after three years, he was sent to Prague to continue his studies at the "Meisterschule" under the guidance of Otakar Ševčík. In 1913, already excellent and renowned, the invitation came to him to play with the Moscow Philharmonic Orchestra. That year he won the annual Austrian "Staatspreis" and soon made artistic tours to Berlin, Vienna, and Genova. He stayed in Trieste during World War I. After living in Britain from 1920 to 1923, he accepted an offer for an American tour, so on January 1, 1924, he left for New York City. In the same year, he settled permanently in the United States. In 1926, he married Joyce Borden, heiress to the Borden family fortune. In the 1920s and 1930s, the couple toured the European continent, performing predominantly for the continent's royalty.

== Political activism ==
Upon the outbreak of World War II, he settled at Hillside Farm in Camden, Maine, where he became involved in many wartime political efforts and chaired six organizations: the Yugoslav Division of the U.S. Treasury War Bond Drives; the Russian War Relief's Nationalities Division, the United Committee of South Slavic Americans; the American Slav Congress of Greater New York; the American Croatian Congress, and the American Committee for Yugoslav Relief (with Eleanor Roosevelt as the president). He advocated Tito's Yugoslav cause. In November 1944, aided by Adlai Stevenson (his nephew by marriage), he went to Washington, D.C. to demand the shipment of medical supplies to the resistance forces. After seeing President Franklin D. Roosevelt, Vice President Henry A. Wallace, United States Secretary of State Edward Stettinius, Jr., Assistant Secretary of War John J. McCloy and Admiral Land, the deal was done and the requested supplies soon reached their destination.

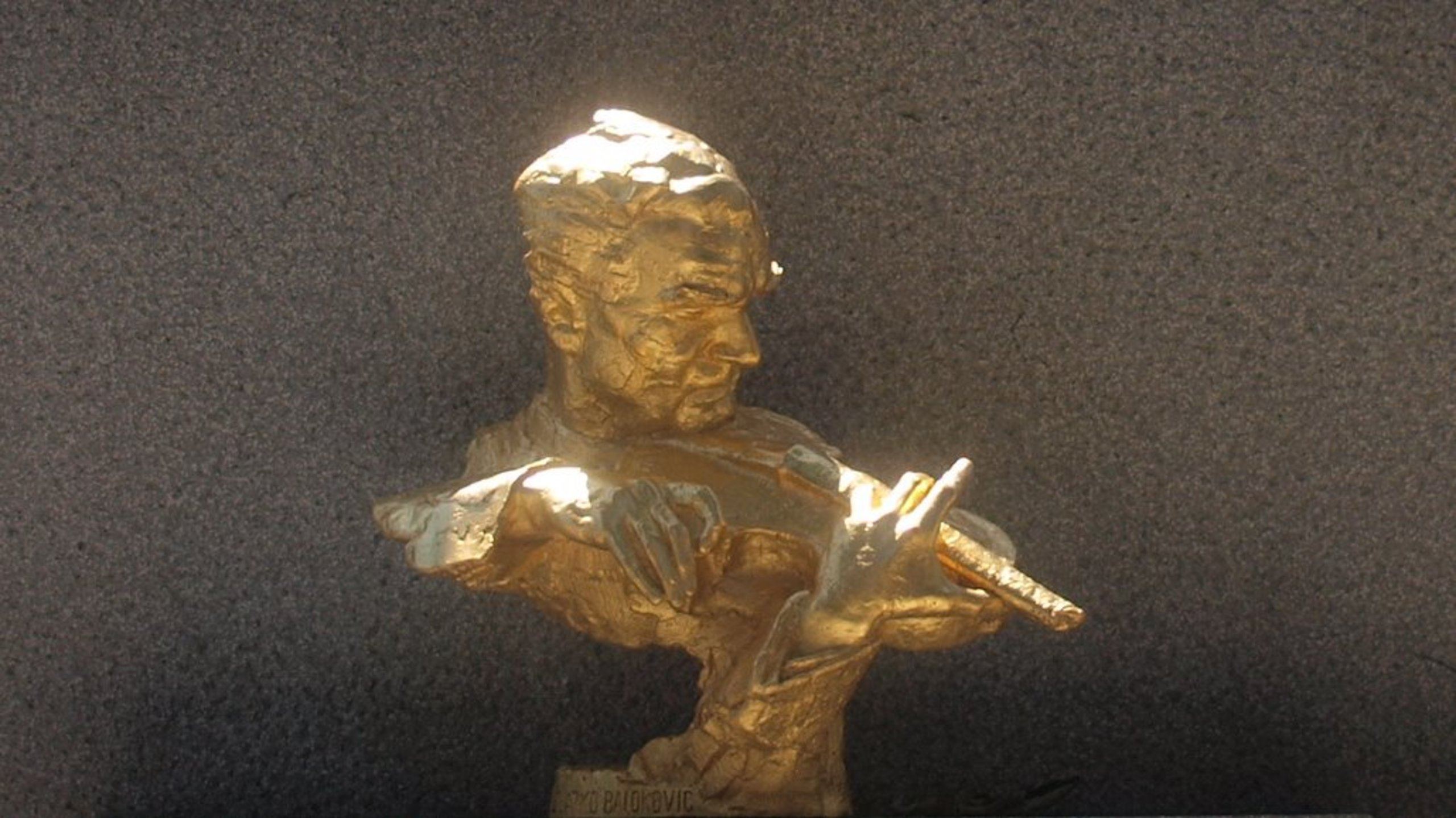
Baloković bust at Mirogoj Cemetery.

In 1946 the couple returned to Yugoslavia as officials of the American Committee for Yugoslav Relief and were showered with that nation's gratitude. He gave 36 concerts and hundreds of speeches, while travelling the entire country in a private railroad car. He personally came to know many high-ranking figures in the Yugoslav government, including Marshal Josip Broz Tito, Georgi Dimitrov of Bulgaria, and Enver Hoxha of Albania.

Upon his return to the U.S. in 1947, he made a coast-to-coast tour to advocate for the people he had met. As a result of the ties to Yugoslav government and membership in wartime organizations, he had come to be considered "subversive". The couple was labelled as "fellow travellers" by the House Committee on Un-American Activities in 1949 but after an ordeal both were cleared. In 1954, he made a second "jubilee" tour. Tito presented him with the Grand Cross of the Yugoslav Flag in recognition of his artistic and humanitarian achievements benefiting nations.

He died in Venice on his way to Zagreb to celebration of his 70th birthday.

Baloković's 1735 "The King" Guarneri violin is kept at the Croatian Academy of Sciences and Arts in Zagreb.
