= Artist diploma =

Graduate diploma for music performance

An artist diploma (ArtDip or AD) is a non-degree graduate diploma, awarded to music students who demonstrate comprehensive performance skills in voice and/or a musical instrument. Generally consisting of a two- or three-year course of study, programs for an artist diploma focus on expanding students' repertoire, refining technique, and advancing technical skills, with an ultimate goal of preparing students for a professional career in music performance.

== Admission prerequisites ==
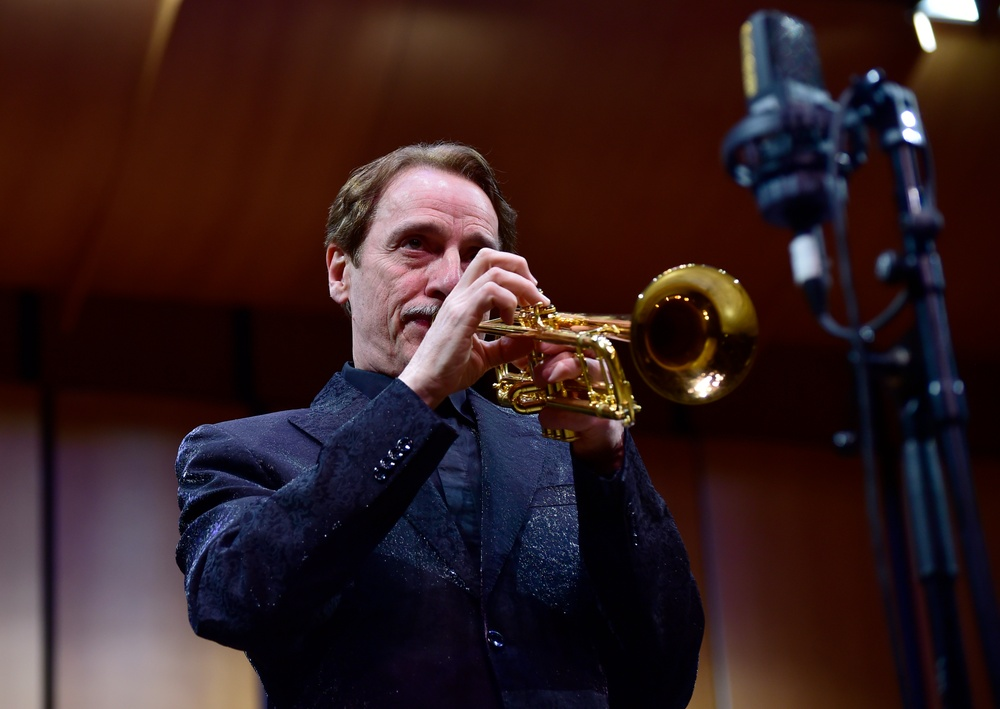
Allen Vizzutti, a trumpet player, was awarded an artist's diploma from the Eastman School of Music.

Artist diploma programs are generally postgraduate in nature, and require applicants to possess an undergraduate or graduate degree in a music-related field (e.g. Bachelor of Music, Bachelor of Arts in Music, Master of Music, Doctor of Music, Doctor of Musical Arts. etc.). Applicants may be subject to testing requirements inherent to postgraduate study, including standardized testing (e.g. the GRE), language comprehension exams (e.g. IELTS, DSH, etc.), or school- and subject-specific entrance examinations. Moreover, applicants are required to audition and demonstrate proficiency in the performance of their instrument. Candidates are expected to have a prior knowledge of music theory and a familiarity with the concepts of musicology and musical interpretation. The selection of candidates is overall highly competitive, and schools tend to admit a very small number of students into artist diploma programs annually.

== Course of study ==
=== Learning goals ===
The objectives of an artist diploma program focus on development and refining the skillets of an individual musician, with particular focuses on musicality and technical skill. Students pursuing an ArtDip typically have comprehensive performing experience prior to admission, and the nature of study will vary student to student as to allow personal growth in the area(s) an individual requires most. These areas are commonly expansion of repertoire, development of performance technique, professional and career growth in the music industry, and ensemble participation.

=== Methods ===
Instruction and assessment during an artist diploma program are predominantly focused on a combination of tutelage and recital. Schools will generally match experienced musicians as mentors with each ArtDip candidate in order to facilitate one-on-one instruction. Students will study both independently and with their mentors, and will demonstrate competency via public performance, either alone or as part of an ensemble. Some schools also require students in the ArtDip program to teach or mentor undergraduate or graduate students as part of a 'learning by teaching' pedagogy.

=== Requisites for completion ===
Studies during an ArtDip program culminate in a major public performance event; this may be a single performance or a series of recitals which are generally solo performances. Such recitals are constrained to style of music, performance duration, and other standardizing criteria as to make assessment equitable for all candidates in the program. Performance examination is most often adjudicated by a jury consisting of the school's faculty. An artist diploma is conferred after the successful completion of the course of study outlined by the particular university.

== Academic reciprocity ==
There is a non-uniform inclination across institutions to accept an artist diploma as a credential of post-graduate achievement. Generally, diplomas — including artist diplomas — conferred from music conservatories have held the same merits as a postgraduate degree in music performance. Academic institutions will assess credibility of an individuals artist diploma based on a variety of factors, including the duration of study, the diploma completion requirements determined by the conferring school, and their relationship and/or confidence in the conferring school.
