= List of compositions by Henri Vieuxtemps =

Below is a sortable list of compositions by Henri Vieuxtemps. The works are categorized by genre, opus number, date of composition, date of first publication, titles and scoring.

Vieuxtemps initially numbered his Air variés Nos. 1–4 with the opus numbers 1–4 (as evidenced by the autograph of Air varié No. 4). In 1833, he restarted the numbering with the variations on a theme from "La muette di Portici", Op. 1. He then followed these with the Norma Variations, Op. 2, and continued the new numbering with the Violin Concerto in E major, Op. 5. He did not reassign the opus numbers 3 and 4, probably because he wanted to leave them with the corresponding Air variés.

The date of composition for many works is unclear, and often appears in many sources to be based on the date of the first publication.

Genre	Opus	Composition date	Publication date	French title (original title)	English title	Scoring	Notes
Chamber music	1	1833	still unpublished	Variations brillantes sur un thème de l'opéra La Muette de Portici d'Auber	Variations on a theme from Aubert's opera "La Muette di Portici"	for violin and piano	autograph in Brussels: B-Br Mus. Ms. 4365, composed in collaboration with Adolf Gutman
Concertante	2	1834	2021	Variations sur un thême favori de Norma, musique de Bellini	Variations on a theme from Bellini's opera "Norma"	for violin and orchestra	not to be confused with Norma fantasia op. 18
Chamber music	3 (?)	1833	2020	3^{me} Air varié pour le violon avec accompagnement de piano ou de 2 violons, alto et basse	3rd Air varié for violin and piano or strings	for violin and piano or strings	Dedicated to Henri Génin ("Dédié a son protecteur Monsieur Génin")
Chamber music	4	1833	2022	4^{me} Air varié pour le violon avec accompagnement de 2 violons, alto et basse ou de piano	4th Air varié for violin and string quartet (or string orchestra) or piano	for violin and strings or piano	dedicated to his first violin teacher Léonard-Joseph Lecloux-Dejonc
Concertante	5	1835/36	2022	Concerto en mi majeur: 1. Allegro; 2. Adagio; 3. Rondo. Allegro moderato	Violin Concerto E major	for violin and orchestra	
Vocal			1836	Le héros mourant, Imitation d'un chant russe	Le héros mourant, Imitation d'un chant russe	for voice and piano	words by J.F. Dobelin; published by Van Lier, La Haye
Chamber music			1838	Fantaisie concertante sur des motifs de l'opéra "Les Huguenots" de G. Meyerbeer	Fantaisie concertante on Themes from Meyerbeer's Opera "Les Huguenots"	for violin and piano	composed in collaboration with Jacques Gregoir (1817–1876)
Chamber music			1838	Duo brillant en forme de fantaisie sur des airs hongrois concertant	Duo brillant en forme de fantaisie sur des airs hongrois concertant	for violin and piano	composed in collaboration with Ferenc Erkel; dedicated to "à Madame la Baronne Fery d'Orczy" (Countess Emma Wass von Szentegyed und Czege, wife of Baron Felix Orczy de Orczi, mother of Baroness Emma Orczy)
Vocal	6		c.1845	Le chevalier	Le chevalier	for voice and piano	published by A.M. Abrahams, La Haye
Chamber music	6	c.1837	1837	Air varié avec introduction de l'opéra "Il Pirata" de Bellini en ré majeur	Air varié with Introduction on a Theme from Bellini's "Il Pirata" in D major	for violin and piano or orchestra	
Concertante	7	1837	still unpublished	2^{me} concerto en si mineur: 1. Moderato; 2. Adagio; 3. Rondo	2nd violin concerto in b minor	for violin and orchestra	Composed as Op. 7, Vieuxtemps reassigned the number 7 as the work was not printed. violin part lost, incomplete autograph in Brussels: B-Br Mus. Ms. 4743
Concertante		finished March 29, 1838	2021	Romance de Beethoven, variée pour le violon avec accompagnement d’orchestre	Variations on the Romance in G major by Beethoven for violin and orchestra	for violin and orchestra	There are also versions for violin solo (1837) and violin and piano (1838).
Chamber music	7	1841	1846	3 Romances sans paroles: 1. Chant d'amour 2. Désespoir; 3. Souvenir	3 Songs without Words: 1. in D♭ major 2. in C minor 3. in C major	for violin and piano	
Chamber music	8 [ 7 ]	c.1845	1850	4 Romances sans paroles: 1. Hilarité; 2. Innocence; 3. Barcarolle; 4. Air Savoyard	4 Songs without Words: 1. in E major 2. in A major 3. in G minor 4. in D major	for violin and piano	published also with Op. 7; the Violin Concerto No. 2 initially published as Op. 8, later Op. 19
Concertante	9b	finished September 22, 1838	2020	La Sentimentale Fantaisie en mi majeur	La Sentimentale Fantaisie in E major	for violin and orchestra or piano	Composed as Op. 9, Vieuxtemps reassigned the number 9 as the work was not printed.
Concertante	9	1845?	1846	Hommage à Paganini, Caprice sur des thèmes du celèbre maestro	Homage to Paganini, Caprice	for violin and orchestra or piano	
Concertante	10	1840	1840	Grand Concerto Nº 1 en mi majeur: 1. Allegro moderato 2. Introduction: Adagio; 3. Rondo: Allegretto	Concerto No. 1 in E major	for violin and orchestra	dedicated "au roi des belges" (Leopold I of Belgium)
Concertante	11	1838	1840	Fantaisie-caprice en la majeur	Fantaisie-caprice in A major	for violin and orchestra	at end: St. Pétersbourg ce 21 Février 1840; dedicated to Jean Radoux ("Offert à son ami Gean Radoux en témoignage de haute estime")
Vocal			1842	Le papillon	Le papillon	for voice and piano	words by Alphonse de Lamartine; published in France Musicale, Paris, 1842: BnF AC M-1745
Concertante		1843	2022	Marche de Rakoczy	Rákóczi March	for violin and orchestra	Autograph in Brussels: B-Br Mus. Ms. 4372
Chamber music	12	1843	1843	Grande sonate concertante en quatre parties en ré majeur: 1. Allegro assai 2. Scherzo: Allegro vivace 3. Largo ma non troppo 4. Rondo: Allegro gioioso	Sonata in D major	for violin and piano	dedicated to pianist Édouard Wolff (1816–1880)
Chamber music	13	c.1843	1843	Grand duo sur des thèmes de "Le duc d'Olonne" d'Auber	Grand duo on Themes from Auber's "Le duc d'Olonne"	for violin and piano	composed in collaboration with Édouard Wolff (1816–1880)
Chamber music	14	c.1843	1844	Grande fantaisie concertante sur l'opéra "Obéron" de C. M. de Weber	Grande fantaisie concertante on Themes from Weber's Opera "Oberon"	for violin and piano	composed in collaboration with Édouard Wolff (1816–1880)
Concertante	15	c.1843	1843	Les arpèges, Caprice	Les arpèges, Caprice in D major	for violin and orchestra (or piano) with obligato cello	
Chamber music	16	c.1845	1845	6 Études de concert: 1. Alegro moderato 2. Moderato; 3. Allegretto; 4. Allegro ma non troppo 5. Adagio, non troppo 6. Adagio	6 Concert Etudes: 1. in G minor 2. in G major 3. in D major 4. in E♭ major 5. in C major 6. in E major	for violin solo	
Chamber music	17	1843	1844	Souvenir d'Amérique, Variations burlesques sur "Yankee Doodle"	Souvenir d'Amérique, Variations burlesques sur "Yankee Doodle"	for violin and piano	also for violin and string quartet
Concertante	18	1844	1844	Norma, Fantaisie sur la quatrième corde	Norma, Fantasia on the G String	for violin and orchestra or piano	
Concertante	19 [ 8 ]	1837	1846	Concerto Nº 2 en fa dièse mineur: 1. Allegro; 2. Andante; 3. Rondo: Allegro	Concerto No. 2 in F♯ minor "Sauret"	for violin and orchestra	composed prior to Violin Concerto No. 1, Op. 10; also published as Op. 8 by C. Joubert in Paris and others; dedicated "à son ami P. de Bremacker"
Chamber music	20 [ 19 ]	c.1845	1845	Duo concertant sur des thèmes de "Don Juan" de Mozart	Duo concertant on Themes from Mozart's "Don Giovanni"	for violin and piano	composed in collaboration with Édouard Wolff (1816–1880); published by Schlesinger in Berlin; also published as Duo brillant sur les motifs de Don Juan de Mozart, Op. 19 by E. Troupenas & Cie in Paris
Concertante	21	c.1845	1846	Souvenirs de russie, Fantaisie	Souvenirs de Russie, Fantasia in B minor	for violin and orchestra or piano	dedicated to B. Rubens
Chamber music / Concertante	22		1846–1847	6 Morceaux de salon: 1. Morceaux brillant 2. Air varié en ré mineur 3. Rêverie: Adagio; 4. Souvenir du Bosphore; 5. Tarantelle; 6. L'orage; Tarantella as a revised version with orchestra as Op. 22, No. 5a	6 Salon Pieces	for violin and piano or orchestra (only no. 2 and no. 5 published with orchestra)	2. dedicated "à son ami Serge Wolkoff"
Chamber music	23 [ 24 ]	c.1845	1854	Grande fantaisie sur l'opéra "L'étoile du nord" de G. Meyerbeer	Grande fantaisie on Themes from Meyerbeer's Opera "L'étoile du nord"	for violin and piano	composed in collaboration with Theodor Kullak; published as Op. 24 by Brandus et C^{ie}.
Transcription			1847	La nuit, Thème de l'ode-symphonie "Le désert"	La nuit	for viola and piano	by Félicien-César David; transcription of "Hymne à la nuit" from Le désert (1844); original for tenor and orchestra
Chamber music	[ 24 ]	c.1847	1847	Grand duo brillant sur des thèmes de l'opéra "Le camp de Silésie" ou "Vielka" de G. Meyerbeer	Grand duo brillant on Themes from Meyerbeer's Opera "A Camp in Silesia" or "Vielka"	for violin and piano	composed in collaboration with Theodor Kullak; published as Op. 24 by Schlesinger
Chamber music	24	c.1850	1852	Divertissements d'amateurs sur des mélodies russes favorites, 6 Morceaux: 1. Romance d'A. Gourileff; 2. Divertissement sur "Le rossignol" d'Alex Alabieff; 3. Romance d'A. Dargomijsky; 4. Romance du Comte M. Wielhorsky (avec violoncelle ad libitum); 5. Chanson russe: Troïka; 6. Deux chansons russes en si mineur et la majeur	6 Divertissements d'amateurs, 6 Pieces on Favorite Russian Melodies	for violin and piano	1. after Aleksandr L'vovich Gurilyov [Gurilev] – Александр Львович Гурилёв (1803–1858); 2. after The Nightingale (Соловей) by Alexander Alyabyev; 3. after Alexander Dargomyzhsky; 4. after Count Matvei Wielhorski (Матвей Юрьевич Виельгорский) (1794–1866)
Chamber music		c.1851	1852	Chansons russes de Werstofsky. Transcrites et variées	Russian songs by Werstofsky. Transcribed and varied	for violin and piano	not to be confused with op. 24, it is a single piece. D-Mbs Mus.Schott.Ha 13194
Concertante	25	1844	1848	Grand Concerto Nº 3 en la majeur: 1. Allegro; 2. Adagio; 3. Rondo: Allegretto	Concerto No. 3 in A major	for violin and orchestra	dedicated to Guillaume II, roi de Hollande
Chamber music	26	c.1850	1850	Grand duo sur des thèmes de l'opéra "Le prophète" de G. Meyerbeer	Grand duo on Themes from Meyerbeer's Opera "Le prophète"	for violin and piano	composed in collaboration with Anton Rubinstein
Concertante	27	c.1850	1851	Grande fantaisie sur des thèmes slaves	Grande fantaisie on Slavic Themes	for violin and orchestra or piano	version for violin and piano published 1878
Chamber music			1852	Duo sur des motifs de "Raymond", ou "Le Secret de la reine", Opéra de Thomas	Duo on Themes from Ambroise Thomas's Opera "Raymond" or "Le Secret de la reine"	for violin and piano	composed in collaboration with Édouard Wolff (1816–1880)
Concertante	28 [ 29 ]	c.1850	1853	Andante et rondo (Introduction et rondo) en mi majeur	Andante et rondo (Introduction et rondo) in E major	for violin and orchestra or piano	published as Op. 29 by J. Schuberth in Leipzig (1853); listed as Op. 28 in Grove and Radoux Vieuxtemps: Sa vie, ses œuvres
Chamber music	29	c.1852	1852–1853	3 Fantaisies sur les opéras de G. Verdi: 1. Fantaisie sur "I Lombardi" (Jérusalem); 2. Fantaisie brillante sur "Ernani"; 3. Fantaisie sur "Luisa Miller"	3 Fantasias on Themes from Verdi's "I Lombardi", "Ernani" and "Luisa Miller"	for violin and piano	published as Op. 29 by Schott in Mainz (and later C.F. Peters)
Chamber music	30	1854?	1854	Élégie en fa mineur	Élégie in F minor	for viola (or cello, or violin) and piano	dedicated to Count Matvei Wielhorski (Матвей Юрьевич Виельгорский) (1794–1866) (see Russian Wikipedia)
Concertante		1854	1854	3 Cadences pour le concerto de violon de L. van Beethoven, œuvre 61	3 Cadenzas to Beethoven's Violin Concerto, Op. 61	for violin solo	
Concertante	31	1849–1850	1854	Grand Concerto Nº 4 en ré mineur: 1. Andante – Moderato; 2. Andante religioso 3. Scherzo: Vivace; 4. Finale marziale: Andante – Allegro	Concerto No. 4 in D minor	for violin and orchestra	composed 1846–1852?
Chamber music			1855	Grand duo sur des motifs de l'opéra "Les Huguenots" de G. Meyerbeer	Grand duo on Themes from Meyerbeer's Opera "Les Huguenots"	for violin and cello	composed in collaboration with Adrien-François Servais
Chamber music	32	c.1850	1856	3 Morceaux de salon: 1. Souvenir de Beauchamps; 2. Rondino; 3. La chasse	3 Salon Pieces	for violin and piano, La Chasse also in a version for solo violin	
Concertante	32a	1861	2024	La Chasse , Impromptu pour violon et instruments à vent	The Hunt, Impromptu for violin and winds	for violin and winds	based on op. 32, no. 3 autograph in Brussels: B-Br Mus. Ms. 4367
Chamber music	33	c.1855	1860	Bouquet américain, 6 Variations sur mélodies populaires: 1. O Willie, We Have Missed You (à Mr. Stephan); 2. St. Patrick's Day (à son ami Aug. Artaria); 3. Days of Absence (à son cher élève Isaac Poznanski); 4. Garry Owen; 5. Last Rose of Summer; 6. Arkansas Traveller and Banjo Tune	Bouquet américain, 6 Variations on Popular Melodies	for violin and piano	
Transcription			c.1855	Grand duo	Grand duo	for viola and piano	transcription of the Clarinet Quintet, KV 581 (1789) by Wolfgang Amadeus Mozart
Arrangement			1855?	"Le trille du Diable", Sonate de Tartini	"The Devil's Trill", Sonata by Giuseppe Tartini	for violin and piano	piano part arranged by Vieuxtemps
Chamber music			1856	Transcription du Quintette avec Clarinette KV 581 de Mozart	Transcription of Mozart's Clarinet Quintet, K. 581	for viola and piano	complete arrangement (all 4 parts) for viola and piano (IMSLP) Only Larghetto as No. 6 from 6 Morceaux de Salon (1868–1872) for viola and piano; original version for violin and piano
Chamber music	34	1859	1859	3 Mährchen (3 Contes): 1. Hausmährchen; 2. Kindermährchen; 3. Wintermährchen	3 Tales: 1. Family Tale; 2. Tale for Children; 3. Winter Tale	for violin and piano	
Concertante	35	c.1859	1859	Fantasia appassionata en sol mineur: 1. Allegro moderato 2. Largo; 3. Finale: Saltarella – Allegro vivace	Fantasia appassionata in G minor	for violin and orchestra or piano	
Transcription			1861	Scène et romance de l'opéra "Halka" de St. Moniuszko	Scène et romance from the Opera "Halka" by Stanisław Moniuszko	for violin and orchestra or piano	adapted for viola and piano by Hieronymus Weickmann
Chamber music	36	1862	1863	Sonate en si bémol majeur: 1. Maestoso. Allegro; 2. Barcarolla: Andante con moto 3. Finale scherzando: Allegretto	Sonata in B♭ major	for viola (or cello) and piano	dedicated to George V, King of Hanover; original version for viola and piano, later transcribed for cello and piano
Concertante	37	1858–1859	1862	Concerto Nº 5 en la mineur "Le Grétry": 1. Allegro non troppo 2. Adagio; 3. Allegro con fuoco	Concerto No. 5 in A minor "Le Grétry"	for violin and orchestra	competition piece for Hubert Léonard and the Conservatory of Brussels; dedicated to Leopold II, Duke of Brabant; movement II borrows "Où peut-on être mieux qu'au sein de sa famille?" from André Grétry's opera Lucile
Concertante	38	c.1858	1863	Ballade et polonaise de concert en sol mineur	Ballade et polonaise de concert in G minor	for violin and orchestra (or piano)	
Concertante	39	1864?	1864	Duo brilliant en la majeur	Duo brilliant in A major	for violin, cello (or viola) and orchestra (or piano)	
Chamber music	40	1863	1864	3 Feuilles d'album, 3 Morceaux: 1. Romance en fa majeur 2. Les regrets 3. Bohémienne	3 Album Leaves, 3 Pieces	for violin and piano	
Concertante	40a	1864	2023	Airs Bohémiens	Gipsy Airs	for violin and orchestra	based on Bohémienne op. 40 no. 3
Choral	41	1863	1863	Ouverture et hymne national belge (Ouverture avec l'hymne national belge)	Overture with the Belgian National Anthem	for chorus and orchestra	
Chamber music			1864	Duo brillant sur des thèmes de l'opéra "Orphée" de Gluck	Duo brillant on Themes from Gluck's Opera "Orphée"	for violin and piano	composed in collaboration with Édouard Wolff (1816–1880)
Chamber music			1864	Duo brillant sur "Les Noces de Figaro" de Mozart	Duo brillant on Mozart's "The Marriage of Figaro"	for violin and piano	composed in collaboration with Édouard Wolff (1816–1880)
Chamber music			1864	Duo brillant sur "Preciosa" de C. M. de Weber	Duo brillant on Weber's "Preciosa"	for violin and piano	composed in collaboration with Édouard Wolff (1816–1880); after the 1820 music for the play by Pius Alexander Wolff
Chamber music	42	1865	1865	Old England, Caprice sur des airs anglais du XVIe et XVIIe siècle	Old England, Caprice on 16th- and 17th-Century English Airs	for violin and piano	
Chamber music		1869?	1869	Fantasie sur "Faust" de Ch. Gounod	Fantasia on Themes from Gounod's "Faust"	for violin and piano or orchestra	dedicated to violinist Wilma Norman-Neruda
Chamber music	43	1871	1871	Suite en si mineur: 1. Preludio; 2. Minuetto; 3. Aria; 4. Gavotta en ré majeur	Suite in B Minor: 1. Preludio; 2. Minuetto; 3. Aria; 4. Gavotte	for violin and piano (Aria and Gavotte also with small orchestra)	
Concertante	43a	1871	2024	Aria et Gavotte	Aria and Gavotte	for violin and small Orchestra	Arrangement of movements 3 and 4 of the Suite, Op. 43, autograph: B-Br Mus. Ms. 4369
Chamber music	44	1871	1871	Quatuor à cordes N° 1 en mi mineur	String Quartet No. 1 in E minor	for 2 violins, viola and cello	dedicated to Monsieur de Rémusat
Chamber music			1868–1872; 1868; 1871; 1871; 1871; 1872; 1872	6 Morceaux de Salon: 1. Souvenir d'amitié, Romance en la majeur, Op. 8bis 2. Andante, tirée de l'œuvre 19; 3. Romance-Sicilienne, tirée de l'œuvre 35; 4. Ballade, tirée de l'œuvre 38; 5. La Nuit, de Félcien David; 6. Larghetto de Mozart (du Quintetto, Op. 108)	6 Salon Pieces: 1. Souvenir d'amitié, Romance in A major, Op. 8bis 2. Andante (from Op. 19); 3. Romance-Sicilienne (from Op. 35); 4. Ballade (from Op. 38); 5. La Nuit, by Félcien David; 6. Larghetto de Mozart	for violin and piano	arrangements for violin and piano 2. movement II of the Violin Concerto No. 2; 5. transcription of "Hymne à la nuit" from Le désert (1844) by Félicien-César David; 6. movement II of the Clarinet Quintet, K. 581 by Wolfgang Amadeus Mozart; also for viola and piano
Chamber music	45		1876	Voix intimes, 6 Pensées mélodiques: 1. Douleurs; 2. Espoir; 3. Foi; 4. Déception; 5. Sérénité; 6. Contemplation	Intimate Voices, 6 Melodic Thoughts: 1. Grief in C♯ minor 2. Hope in A♭ major 3. Faith in D♭ major 4. Disappointment in F minor 5. Serenity in E major 6. Contemplation in B minor	for violin and piano	dedicated to Madame Léon van Hennebryck
Concertante	46	1875–1876	1877	Concerto Nº 1 en la minuer: 1. Allegro moderato 2. Andante; 3. Finale: Allegro	Concerto No. 1 in A minor	for cello and orchestra	dedicated to Guillaume III
Chamber music		c.1877	1877	Duo sur des motifs de l'opéra "Paul et Virginie" de V. Massé	Duo on Themes of Victor Massé's Opera "Paul et Virginie"	for violin and piano	composed in collaboration with "D. Magnus", pianist Désiré Magnus (1828–1884); dedication "À Mademoiselle Alix Massé"
Concertante	47	1865	1880	Concerto Nº 6 en sol majeur: 1. Allegro moderato 2. Pastorale: Andante con moto 3. Intermezzo siciliano 4. Rondo final: Allegretto	Concerto No. 6 in G major	for violin and orchestra	Op. 1 posthumous; dedicated to violinist Wilma Norman-Neruda; composed 1877–1881?
Chamber music			c.1880	Fantaisie sur "Lucia di Lammermoor", Souvenir de Donizetti	Fantasia on "Lucia di Lammermoor", Souvenir de Donizetti	for violin and piano	published as Op. 33 (c.1880)
Chamber music	48	1881	1882	36 Études: 6. Un conte; 7. Tourmente; 15. Dédiée à M. le Duc de Camposelice; 20. Lament; 21. Souvenir de Schumann; 22. Mélancolie; 24. Inquiétude; 26. Cantilène; 27. Tarantelle; 36. Variations sur la célèbre Gavotte de Corelli	36 Études	for violin and piano or for violin solo	Op. 2 posthumous; dedicated to the Conservatoire de Paris
Concertante	49	1879–1881	1882	Concerto Nº 7 en la mineur "À Jenő Hubay": 1. Moderato; 2. Mélancolie; 3. Allegro vivo	Concerto No. 7 in A minor "À Jenő Hubay"	for violin and orchestra	Op. 3 posthumous; dedicated to violinist Jenő Hubay
Concertante	50	1879	1884	Concerto Nº 2 en si mineur: 1. Allegro; 2. Adagio; 3. Finale: Allegretto con moto	Concerto No. 2 in B minor	for cello and orchestra	Op. 4 posthumous; dedicated to cellist Joseph Servais (1850–1885)
Vocal		c. 1880	1976	5 Mélodies: 1. Mélancolie; 2. Toi; 3. Décision; 4. Les angelots et les cigognes 5. La mort du meunier	5 Songs: 1. Melancholy (Eichendorff); 2. You (Flachsland); 3. Decision (Uhland); 4. Cherubim and Storks (Eichendorff); 5. The Death of the Miller (Kerner)	for voice and piano	German-language songs, presumably composed for his German-speaking daughter Julie Vieuxtemps, who was a singer (even if the last song is for male voice).
Chamber music	51		1884	Quatuor à cordes Nº 2 en ut majeur	String Quartet No. 2 in C major	for 2 violins, viola and cello	Op. 5 posthumous
Chamber music	52		1884	Quatuor à cordes Nº 3 en si bémol majeur	String Quartet No. 3 in B♭ major	for 2 violins, viola and cello	Op. 6 posthumous
Chamber music	53		1883	Voies de cœur, 9 Morceaux: 1. Tendresse; 2. Décision; 3. Mélancolie; 4. Barcarolle; 5. Rêve; 6. Interrogation; 7. Souvenir; 8. Pourquoi?; 9. Thème et variations	Voices of the Heart, 9 Pieces	for violin and piano	Op. 7 posthumous; also Voix du cœur
Chamber music	54		1883	3 Fantaisies brilliantes: 1. Saltarelle; 2. Sérénade; 3. Pochade américaine	3 Fantaisies brilliantes	for violin and piano	Op. 8 posthumous 1. dedicated to Benjamin Godard; orchestrated by Godard as Op. 54a
Chamber music	55		1883	6 Morceaux pour violon seul suivis d'un Capriccio pour alto seul: 1. Andante; 2. Moderato; 3. Prélude; 4. Tempo di minuetto 5. Andante; 6. Introduction et fugue: Adagio cantabile 7. Capriccio "Hommage à Paganini"	6 Pieces for Solo Violin, Followed by a Capriccio for Solo Viola	for violin solo: 7. for viola solo	Op. 9 posthumous: 3. dedicated to violinist Léon Reynier
Chamber music	55		1883	Capriccio "Hommage à Paganini"	Capriccio "Hommage à Paganini" in C minor	for viola solo	Op. 9 posthumous
Chamber music	56		1883	Salut à l'Amérique, Fantaisie originale	Greeting to America, Fantasia	for violin and piano or orchestra	Op. 10 posthumous
Chamber music	57		1883	Impressions et réminiscences de Pologne	Impressions and Memories of Poland	for violin and piano	Op. 11 posthumous; dedicated "à son gendre le D^{r} Édouard Landowski" (to his son-in-law Dr. Édouard Landowski)
Chamber music	58		1883	Ma marche funèbre	My Funeral March	for violin and piano	Op. 12 posthumous
Chamber music	59	Piano reduction of the 1st movement completed on November 12, 1880	1884	Allegro de concert en si mineur (1^{er} Morceau d'un 8^{e} Concerto inachevé, en si mineur)	Allegro de concert in B minor	for violin and piano	Op. 13 posthumous; movement I from the incomplete Violin Concerto No. 8; dedicated to violinist Eugène Ysaÿe
Chamber music	60		1884	Sonate inachevée (Allegro et scherzo) en si bémol majeur (1^{er} et 2^{me} morceaux d'une sonate inachevée): 1. Allegro; 2. Scherzo	Unfinished sonata in B♭ major: 1. Allegro in B♭ major 2. Scherzo in F minor	for viola and piano	Op. 14 posthumous; movements I and II of an incomplete sonata
Chamber music	61		1883	Divertissement	Divertissement	for violin solo	Op. 15 posthumous; dedicated to violinist Lambert Massart
Chamber music		c. 1880	2021	Marche funèbre : adieux adressés à un grand homme	Funeral march for string quartet in E♭ minor	for string quartet	
Chamber music				Étude en ut mineur	Étude in C minor	for viola and piano	undated manuscript found (c.1970) in the Brussels Museum
Chamber music				Trio sur "L'africaine" de Meyerbeer	Piano Trio on Themes from Meyerbeer's "L'Africaine"	for violin, cello and piano	

== Sources ==
- Radoux, Jean Théodore (1835–1911). Vieuxtemps: Sa vie, ses œuvres, A. Bénard, Liège, 1891.
- Vieuxtemps online, digitised sources, offered by the Royal Library of Brussels
