= Machold Rare Violins =

German historic string instrument trade company

Machold Rare Violins, domiciled in Bremen, was the global market leader in the historic string instruments trade.

== Background ==
The company was established in 1861 in Markneukirchen as a violin manufacturer. The owner was Dietmar Harry Joachim Machold, born in 1949 and resident at Schloss Eichbüchl bei Katzelsdorf. Of the surviving 600 violins, 60 cellos and 12 violas crafted by Antonio Stradivari in Cremona, Italy, around half have passed through Machold's. The company also sold Guarneri del Gesù violins.

Dietmar Machold was given the title of honorary professor for a collection of historic violins he procured for the Oesterreichische Nationalbank.

== Criminal investigation ==
Two bankers from Sparkasse Bremen bank invited violin maker Roger Hargrave to inspect their violins, which they believed to be Stradivarius violins. Machold had represented them as such when he offered them as collateral for a multi-million dollar loan. Had the violins been genuine, their estimated combined sale price would be around €5.2 million (US$6.8 million). Upon viewing the instruments Hargrave said they were not made by Stradivari, and the estimated value for each piece would only be around €2,000-€3,000. The violins were also examined by forestry expert Michael Beuting; in his analysis of the wood used to craft the violins, Beuting concluded that trees had not been felled during Stradivari's lifetime. Beuting also stated that the wood had not come from the Southern Alps, where the spruce trees used by Stradivari can be found.

The 1765 Carlo Ferdinando Landolfi viola, which had been given to Machold in commission, appeared on a Flessabank list having been used as collateral, but the bank had not received physical possession of the viola. Instead the viola, along with another by Camillus Camilli, had ended up at the Raiffeisenlandesbank Niederösterreich-Wien (Austrian Savings Banks). He then gave the lenders at Flessabank different instruments that didn't belong to him, which were seized during the investigation. Machold told police that he had sold the Ex-Rosé Stradivarius in 2006 for €3 million to pay off his loan with BAWAG. However, he had also used the violin for collateral with Bayerische HypoVereinsbank, who received nothing. Machold admitted that he "duplicated certificates for violins" when he needed.

46 criminal complaints were filed in Australia, the United States, the Netherlands, Belgium and Germany.

=== Arrest and Conviction ===
Dietmar Machold was arrested in Switzerland in March 2011. He was accused of embezzlement and grand commercial fraud, among other things. A further reason for his arrest is the fact that Machold has settled in Switzerland instead of remaining in Austria. In November 2012, Machold was convicted of embezzlement and fraud by an Austrian court. He was sentenced to 6 years in prison.

== Organization ==
Machold had branch establishments in Vienna, Zurich (Geigenbau Machold GmbH and Cadenza AG), Alpnach (Bomalu AG), Bremen, Berlin, New York City, Aspen, Chicago, Seoul and Tokyo, buying and selling, among others, Stradivari and del Gesù violins.

=== Insolvency proceedings ===
==== Personal bankruptcy ====
Dietmar Machold purchased Eichbüchl Castle in 1997; he paid 1 million deutchemarks for the 700 year old castle, which is located outside Vienna. The castle was sold for €3.5 million, and the collection of period furniture, rugs and library for €120,000. The house he inherited from his parents in Bremen was sold for €350,000.

On 22 October 2010 Dietmar Machold initiated a restructuring proceeding with self-administration with regard to his private assets. On 1 December 2010 the court revoked his right to self-administer his assets. On 29 December 2010 the court appointed a committee of creditors and the proceedings were altered to include insolvency proceedings. The business was ordered to be closed down on 4 February 2011.

==== Company insolvency ====
On 29 October 2010 Dietmar Machold initiated a restructuring proceeding with self-administration with regard to his company assets. For this, the court revoked his right to self-administer his assets on 23 November 2010. The company was ordered to be closed down on 21 December 2010 and the proceedings were altered to include insolvency proceedings.

== See also ==
- John & Arthur Beare
- Bein & Fushi
- List of Stradivarius instruments
