= Viola Sonata No. 1 (Vieuxtemps) =

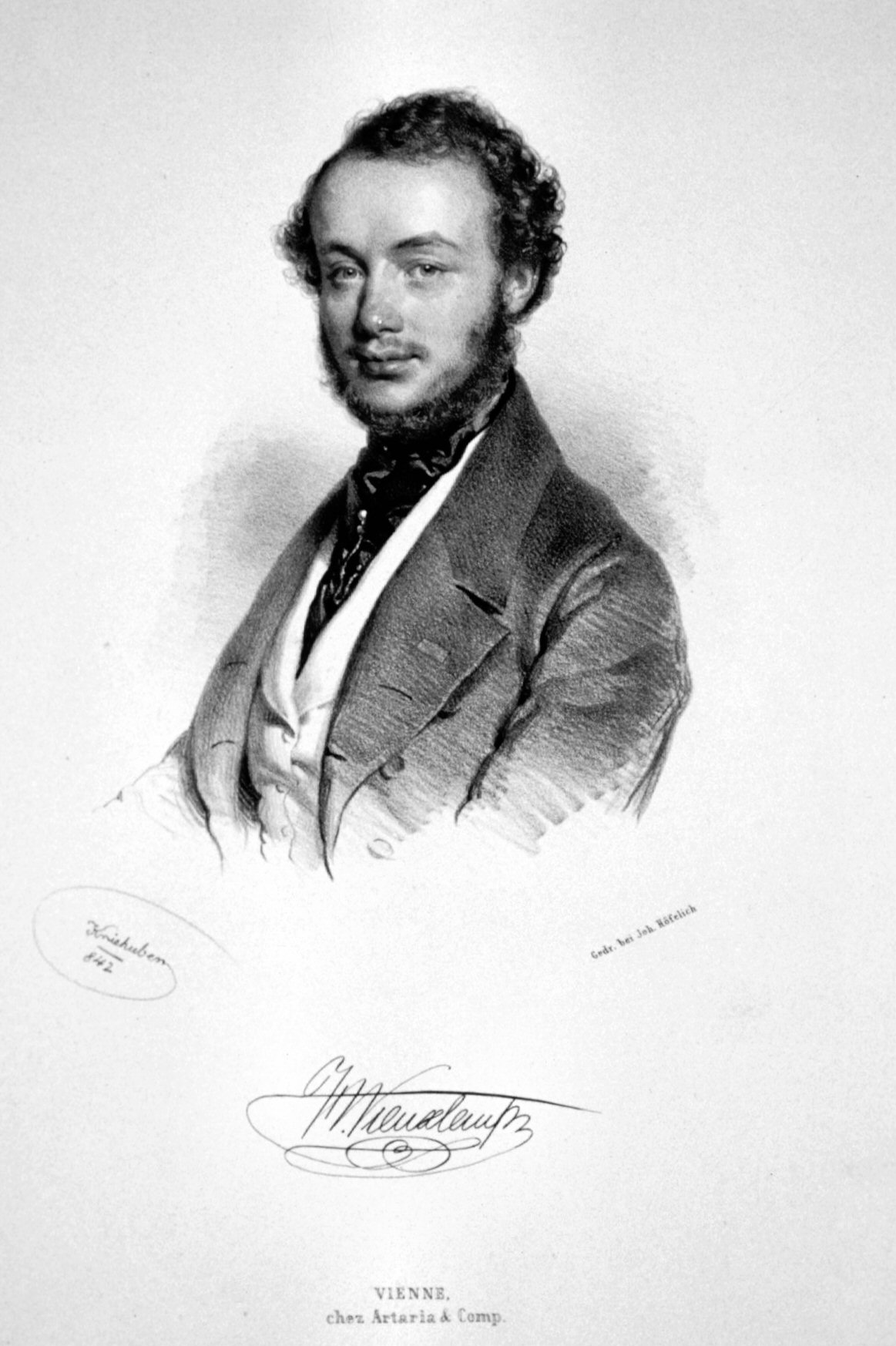
Henri Vieuxtemps, Lithograph by Josef Kriehuber, 1842

Henri Vieuxtemps's Viola Sonata No. 1 in B♭ major, Op. 36 is a composition for viola (or cello) and piano composed in 1860, and published in 1862.

== Background ==
Vieuxtemps began composing the Viola Sonata in 1860 at around the same time as he began work on his fifth violin concerto; it was some twelve years after his last composition for this combination of instruments, the Élégie, Op. 30 of 1848. The Viola Sonata was completed in late 1860 with the first performance, featuring the composer and pianist Arabella Goddard, taking place on 21 January 1861, at St James's Hall in London. Two further performances occurred in London: on 15 February 1861, with the same performers as at the premiere; and on 15 April 1861, with the composer and Charles Hallé. The first continental European performance of the sonata was on 2 June 1861, when the composer and his wife, Josephine Eder, performed it in Brussels.

It was published by J. Schuberth & Co. in late 1862, with a dedication to King George V of Hanover. Initially released for viola and piano only, a revised edition incorporating an optional cello part as an alternative to the viola did not appear until mid 1863.

== Structure ==
The composition is in three movements.

1. Maestoso – Allegro
2. Barcarolla: Andante con moto
3. Finale Scherzando: Allegretto

Typical performances last around 23 minutes.
