= Philippe Quint =

- Born: March 26, 1974 (age 51); Leningrad, USSR
- Genres: Classical
- Occupation: Violinist
- Instrument: Violin
- Labels: Warner Classics
- Website: Official website

Philippe Quint (born March 26, 1974) is an American classical violinist.

== Biography ==
Quint was born on March 26, 1974, in Leningrad. He studied at Moscow's Special Music School for the Gifted with Russian violinist Andrei Korsakov and made his orchestral debut at the age of nine. After immigrating to the United States in 1991, he earned both bachelor's and master's degrees from Juilliard School, graduating in 1998. He is now an American citizen.

== Music ==
Quint plays the 1708 "Ruby" Antonio Stradivari violin, which is on loan to him through the Stradivari Society.

He has released 15 recordings to critical acclaim and has won several awards, including his 2001 debut album, a recording of William Schuman's Violin Concerto, which was named "Editor's Choice" by both Gramophone and Strad magazines and received two Grammy Award nominations. His 2005 recording of Bernstein's "Serenade" with Marin Alsop was selected as "CD of the Week" by the UK's Daily Telegraph and "Editor's Choice" by Gramophone. He was again nominated for a Grammy Award in 2009 for his rendition of Korngold's Violin Concerto, which reached the top 20 on Billboard's Classical Chart during its first week of release.

In August 2010, Naxos Records released Quint's album of works by Niccolo Paganini arranged by Fritz Kreisler. In 2019 Quint ventured outside the classical music repertoire, releasing the album Chaplin's Smile, with arrangements of music that Charlie Chaplin wrote for his films.

Quint has performed around the world, appearing with world's leading orchestras including London Philharmonic, Chicago Symphony, Royal Scottish National Orchestra, Seattle Symphony, Los Angeles Philharmonic, Detroit Symphony, Houston Symphony, Singapore Symphony, KBS Symphony, Berlin Komische Oper Orchestra, among many others. In 2004, he was the featured soloist at Walt Disney Concert Hall in Los Angeles, in the world premiere of Lera Auerbach's Concerto No. 1, which was written for and dedicated to him. In October 2010 he played the Violin Concerto of Erich Wolfgang Korngold in the concerts marking the 60th anniversary of the Nordwestdeutsche Philharmonie.

His live performances and interviews have been broadcast on CBS, CNN, ABC, BBC, NBC, Reuters, Bloomberg TV, NPR, KUSC, KDFC, WNYC, and WQXR.

He is a founder and artistic director of the Mineria Chamber Music Festival in Mexico City. He has been a soloist with the Orquesta Sinfónica de Minería.
