= Kiesewetter Stradivarius =

1723 antique violin by Antonio Stradivari

The Kiesewetter Stradivarius of circa 1723 is an antique violin fabricated by Italian luthier Antonio Stradivari of Cremona (1644–1737). The instrument derives its name from its previous owner, German composer and violinist Christophe Gottfried Kiesewetter (1777–1827).

In 2006, the Stradivari Society brokered an agreement between Clement and Karen Arrison, current owners of the Kiesewetter, and a Grammy-nominated Russian violinist, Philippe Quint. Stipulated in the contract, Quint was to retain possession of the violin for one year in exchange for its US$6,000 insurance premium, the performance of three private recitals for the Arrisons, and regular inspections by The Society's curators. Its latest valuation was US$4 million. The contract was renewed for a second year in May 2007.

On 20 April 2008, Quint accidentally left the Kiesewetter in the back of a taxicab in New York City. After numerous phone calls, the violin was found and returned to Quint the next day. The cabdriver, Mohamed Khalil, was presented with a medallion by the City of Newark, the highest honour awarded by the city.

Since August 2010, Augustin Hadelich has been playing the Kiesewetter on extended loan from the Arrisons through The Stradivari Society.

== Provenance ==
- Christoph G. Kiesewetter
- Francis Goldschmidt
- Charles Fletcher of Bournemouth (ca. 1800)
- Gary Hart (ca. 1902)
- Henry Osborne Havemeyer (1905)
- Horace Havemeyer (1907)
- Rembert Wurtlitzer Inc. (1953)
- Dr. Jerome Gross (ca. 1960)
- Howard Gottlieb (1972)
- J. & A. Beare (1986)
- Clement and Karen Arrison (ca. 2000)

== See also ==
- Stradivarius
