= J & A Beare =

London violin repair and dealership

J & A Beare (John & Arthur Beare) is a violin dealership and repair shop in central London founded in 1892. While in earliest incarnations, it constructed new instruments, it came over time primarily to focus on older ones. Primarily a family business throughout its history, it included outside partners at its inception and in 1998 merged with another long established violin dealer, Morris & Smith, who has run the business since the resignation of Charles Beare in 2012.

== History ==
John Beare (1847-1928) founded his shop in 1865. According to an 1898 book, he had soon gained "practically a monopoly of the old violin business in the provinces", being both knowledgeable and a skilled performer. In 1892, he divided his business in two, forming Beare & Son and Beare, Goodwin & Co, taking on Edward Goodwin as a partner in the latter and leaving his son Walter to run the former. The company dates its formation to that division.

Beare, Goodwin & Co at that time was primarily engaged in selling high end violins and violoncellos, many of which were imported. However, John Beare's son Arthur had an interest in working with older instruments, which influenced the development of the company.

Beginning in 1912, the Royal Academy of Music each year awards a Beare's violin bow as a student prize.

In 1954, Beare, Goodwin & Co. changed its name to J & A Beare. In 1998, the company merged with London-based violin dealers Morris and Smith.

== François Barzoni Violins ==
François Barzoni was the trade name for violins manufactured for Beare & Sons around the turn of the 20th century. They were made in workshops in France and Germany, and the quality and price varied from instrument to instrument.

== See also ==
- Bein & Fushi
- Machold Rare Violins
- Luigi Tarisio
- List of Stradivarius instruments
- List of companies based in London
