= Henri Vieuxtemps =

Belgian composer and violinist

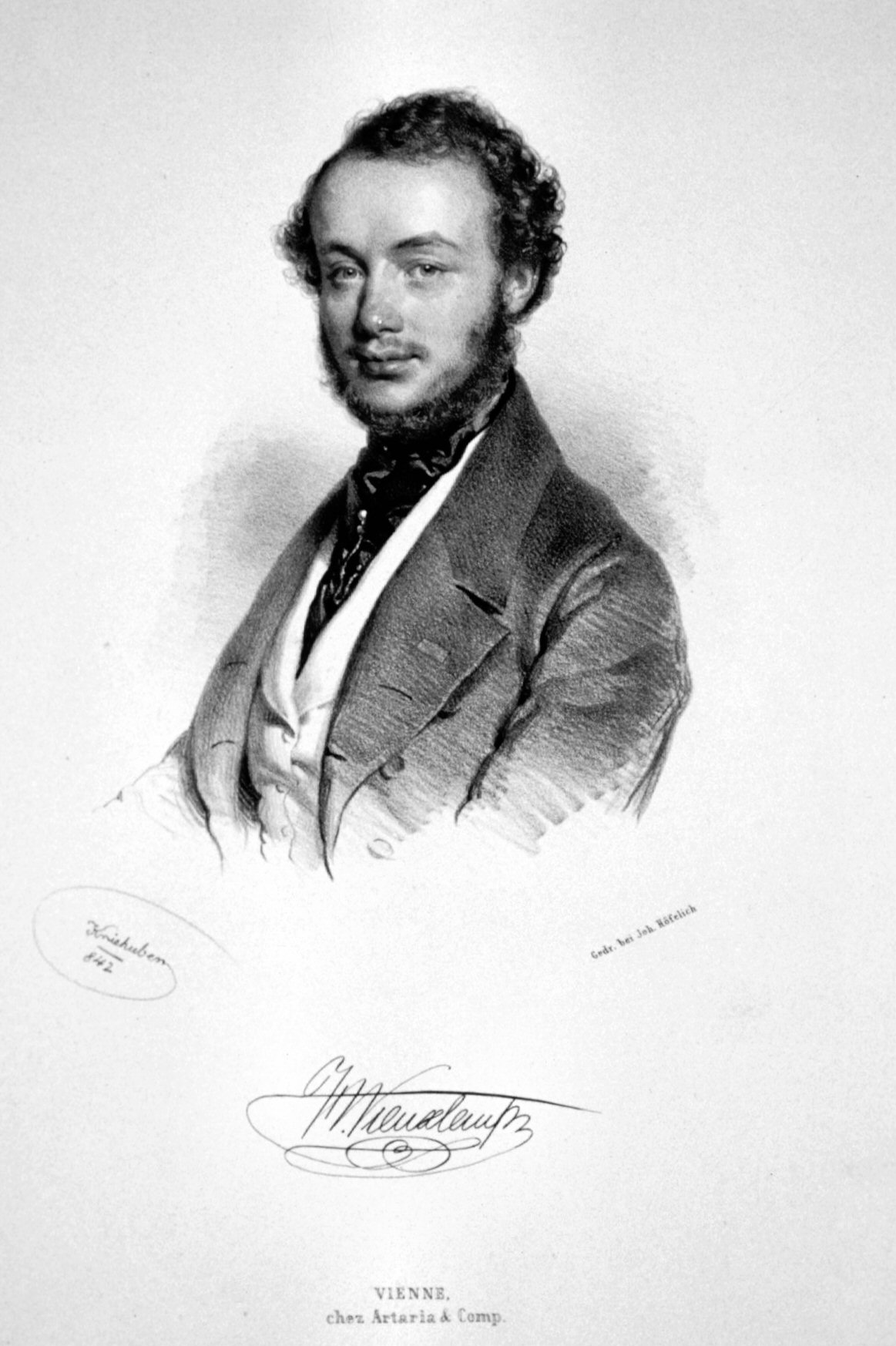
Henri Vieuxtemps, Lithograph by Josef Kriehuber, 1842

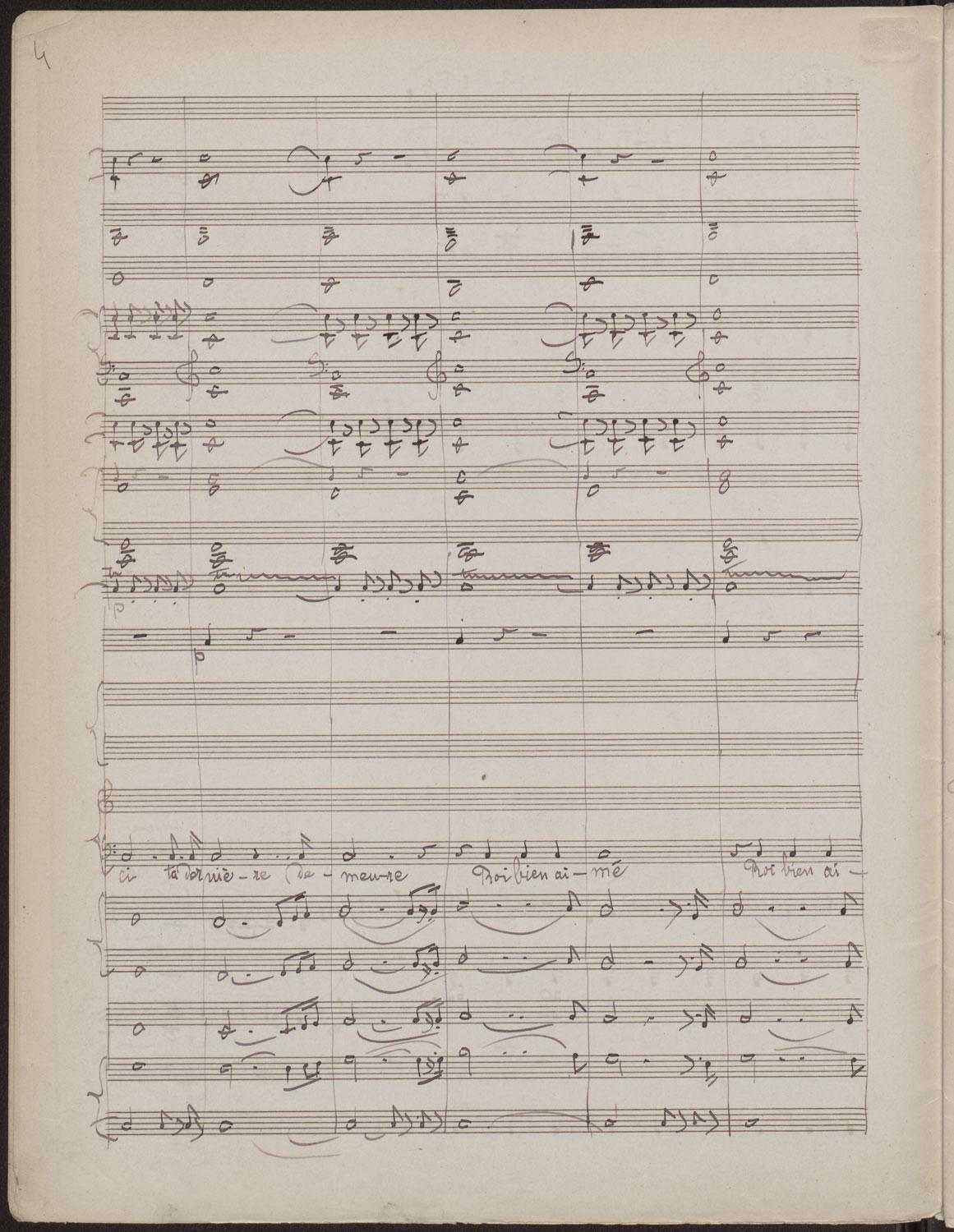
Sheet music for La Fiancée de Messine from the King Baudouin Foundation.

Henri François Joseph Vieuxtemps (French: [ɑ̃ʁi fʁɑ̃swa ʒozɛf vjøtɑ̃]; 17 February 1820 – 6 June 1881) was a Belgian composer and violinist. He occupies an important place in the history of the violin as a prominent exponent of the Franco-Belgian violin school during the mid-19th century. He is also known for playing what is now known as the Vieuxtemps Guarneri del Gesù, a violin of superior workmanship.

== Biography ==
Vieuxtemps was born in Verviers, Belgium (then part of the United Kingdom of the Netherlands), son of a weaver and amateur violinist and violin-maker. He received his first violin instruction from his father and a local teacher and gave his first public performance at the age of six, playing a concerto by Pierre Rode. Soon he was giving concerts in various surrounding cities, including Liège, La Haye and Brussels where he met the violinist Charles Auguste de Bériot, with whom he began studies.

In 1829, Bériot took him to Paris where he made a successful concert debut, again with a concerto by Rode, but he had to return the next year because of the July Revolution and Bériot's marriage to his mistress Maria Malibran and departure on concert tour. Back in Brussels, Vieuxtemps continued developing his violin technique on his own, his musicianship deepened by playing with the deeply musical mezzo-soprano Pauline Viardot, Malibran's sister. A tour of Germany in 1833 brought friendship with Louis Spohr and with Robert Schumann, who compared the boy to Niccolò Paganini. During the following decade he visited various European cities, impressing with his virtuosity not only audiences but also famous musicians such as Hector Berlioz and Paganini himself, whom he encountered at his London debut in 1834.

He had aspirations of becoming a composer as well and, having already taken lessons with the respected Simon Sechter in Vienna, spent the winter of 1835–1836 studying composition with Anton Reicha in Paris. His first violin concerto in E major, Op. 5, dates from this period, followed by further composition lessons with Simon Sechter in the winter of 1836/37, who helped him compose the still unpublished concerto in B minor, Op. 7, followed by the concerto in F♯ minor, which was later published as his Concerto No. 2, Op. 19.

His Violin Concerto E major, Op. 10 (published as concerto No. 1) was acclaimed when he played it in Saint Petersburg on his second visit in 1840 and in Paris the next year; Berlioz found it "a magnificent symphony for violin and orchestra". Based in Paris, Vieuxtemps continued to compose with great success and perform throughout Europe. With the pianist Sigismond Thalberg, he performed in the United States.

In early 1846 he visited the English city of Leeds where he met and offered to tutor George Haddock whilst he performed in London. Haddock and Vieuxtemps became friends and he would stay with Haddock when visiting and performing in Leeds.

He was particularly admired in Russia where he resided permanently between 1846 and 1851 as a court musician of Tsar Nicholas I and soloist in the Imperial Theatre. He founded the violin school of the Saint Petersburg Conservatory and guided the formation of a "Russian school" of violinists. In 1871, he returned to his native country to accept a professorship at the Royal Conservatory of Brussels, where his most illustrious pupil was Eugène Ysaÿe.

A paralytic stroke disabled his right arm two years later and he moved to Paris again, his violin class being taken over by Henryk Wieniawski. Although he seemed to be gradually recovering from his stroke, another one in 1879 ended his career as a violinist for good. He spent his last years in a sanatorium in Mustapha Supérieur, Algeria, where his daughter and her husband had settled, and continued to compose, though frustrated by his inability to play or, far from the musical centres of Europe, even hear his music played by others.

The bulk of Vieuxtemps' compositions were for his own instrument, including nine concertos (plus the unfinished concerto, Op. 59) and a variety of short salon pieces, though towards the end of his life, when he had to give up the violin, he often turned to other instruments, writing two cello concertos, a viola sonata and three string quartets among other things. It is because of his violin concertos, however, that Vieuxtemps is generally known to audiences and musicians around the world. Through his own concertos and his advocacy of the concertos of Beethoven (he also played Beethoven's sonatas and string quartets) and Mendelssohn, he added a more classical dimension to the violin repertoire which had tended towards technically brilliant but often shallow variations and fantasies on popular operatic themes. Vieuxtemps never indulged in sheer virtuosity for its own sake, like some of his predecessors. Eugène Ysaÿe quotes him as saying "Not runs for the sake of runs – sing, sing!"

== Vieuxtemps del Gesù ==
Vieuxtemps is also known for owning and playing what is now referred to as the Vieuxtemps Guarneri del Gesù, a violin, built in 1741, that is considered one of the finest examples of the craftsmanship of Giuseppe Guarneri and which is considered to be without defect despite its continued use over many years. The "del Gesù" (literally "of Jesus") refers to the manufacture by Bartolomeo Giuseppe Guarneri who incorporated the nomina sacra, I.H.S. (iota-eta-sigma) and a Roman Cross in the labels he affixed to his work. At Vieuxtemps' funeral the violin was carried upon a pillow behind the hearse carrying the body. The instrument was later played by noted violin masters like Yehudi Menuhin, Itzhak Perlman and Pinchas Zukerman. In January 2012 the instrument was purchased, by a private collector, for an undisclosed sum and lifetime use of it bequeathed to violinist Anne Akiko Meyers.

== Honours ==
- Knight of the Order of Leopold.

== Major works ==
For a complete listing, see List of compositions by Henri Vieuxtemps.

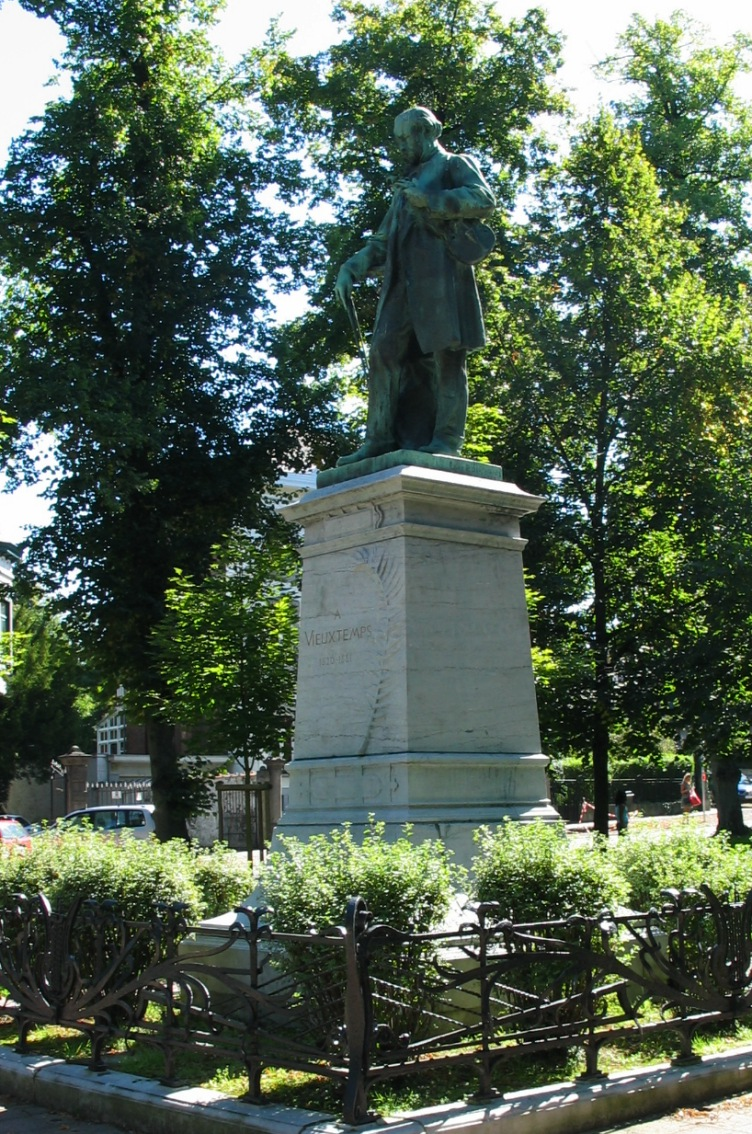
Memorial in Verviers

Concertante

- Violin Concerto in E major, Op. 5 (1836)
- Violin Concerto in B minor, Op. 7 (1837)
- Violin Concerto No. 1 in E major, Op. 10 (1840)
- Les arpèges (Caprice) in D major for violin and orchestra (or piano) with cello obligato, Op. 15 (c.1845)
- Violin Concerto No. 2 in F♯ minor "Sauret", Op. 19 (1837)
- Violin Concerto No. 3 in A major, Op. 25 (1844)
- Violin Concerto No. 4 in D minor, Op. 31 (c.1850)
- Fantasia appassionata for violin and orchestra, Op. 35 (c.1860)
- Violin Concerto No. 5 in A minor "Le Grétry", Op. 37 (1861)
- Ballade et polonaise de concert for violin and orchestra, Op. 38 (c.1858)
- Duo brilliant in A major for violin, cello (or viola) and orchestra or piano, Op. 39 (1864?)
- Cello Concerto No. 1 in A minor, Op. 46 (1877)
- Violin Concerto No. 6 in G major, Op. 47 (1865) (Op. 1 posthumous)
- Violin Concerto No. 7 in A minor "À Jenő Hubay", Op. 49 (1870) (Op. 3 posthumous)
- Cello Concerto No. 2 in B minor, Op. 50 (1879) (Op. 4 posthumous)
- Allegro de concert for violin and orchestra, Op. 59 (Op. 13 posthumous); movement I of the unfinished Violin Concerto No. 8

Chamber music

- String Quartet No. 1 in E minor, Op. 44 (1871)
- String Quartet No. 2 in C major, Op. 51 (Op. 5 posthumous)
- String Quartet No. 3 in B♭ major, Op. 52 (Op. 6 posthumous)

Violin and piano

- 3 Romances sans paroles, Op. 7 (1841)
- 4 Romances sans paroles, Op. 8 (c.1845)
- Violin Sonata in D major, Op. 12 (1843)
- Souvenir d'Amérique, Variations burlesques sur "Yankee Doodle", Op. 17 (1843)
- Souvenir de Russie (Fantasie), Op. 21 (c.1845)
- 6 Morceaux de salon, Op. 22 (1847?)
- 3 Morceaux de salon, Op. 32 (c.1850)
- Bouquet américain, 6 Variations sur mélodies populaires, Op. 33 (c.1855)
- 3 Feuilles d'album, Op. 40 (1864)
- Old England, Caprice on 16th- and 17th-Century English Airs, Op. 42 (1865)
- Suite in B Minor, Op. 43 (1871)
- Voix intimes, 6 pensées melodiques, Op. 45 (1876)
- Voies de cœurs, 6 pièces, Op. 53 (Op. 7 posthumous)
- Fantaisies brilliantes, Op. 54 (Op. 8 posthumous)
- Salut à l'Amérique (Greeting to America), Op. 56 (Op. 10 posthumous)
- Impressions et réminiscences de Pologne, Op. 57 (Op. 11 posthumous)

Viola

- Élégie in F minor for viola (or cello) and piano, Op. 30 (1848)
- Viola Sonata in B♭ major, Op. 36 (1863)
- Capriccio "Hommage à Paganini" in C minor for viola solo, Op. 55 (Op. 9 posthumous)
- Sonate inachevée (Allegro et Scherzo) in B♭ major for viola and piano, Op. 60 (Op. 14 posthumous)
