= Music jury =

A music jury is a final performance by a music student for a panel of adjudicators, usually consisting of faculty of the institution. Students attend private lessons throughout the year, and they perform at the end of a semester or the year to illustrate progress before the panel.
