= Deutsche Sprachprüfung für den Hochschulzugang =

German language scholastic entrance examination

The Deutsche Sprachprüfung für den Hochschulzugang (German for German language examination for university entrance, DSH for short) is a language proficiency test required for entry to a German university and to undertake all classes in the German language.

It consists of a written and an oral examination, the written part being a precondition for the oral one. Students are allowed to repeat the exam as often as they want, and they can use a German–German dictionary during the written examinations. The grading scale of DSH is between 1–3 with 3 being the best possible grade. A detailed breakdown of the percentile achieved in each part of the examination will also be given on the certificate.

Proficiency levels according to the Common European Framework of Reference (CEFR):
DSH 1 (≥57%): Level B2
DSH 2 (≥67%): Level C1
DSH 3 (≥82%): Level C2

== Written examination ==
Consists of the following parts:

- Listening comprehension and use of the language from a listening text
- Reading comprehension and use of the language from a reading text
- Comprehension and application of language in academic language

== Oral examination ==
As a rule the oral examination lasts about 20 minutes. Some institutions offer the possibility of exemption from the oral examination by an excellent result in the written examination.

During the oral examination the following points will be considered:

- Does the language you use correspond adequately to the question/assignment?
- Are you able to express yourself independently with a differentiated viewpoint?
- Is the language you use correct?
- Is your pronunciation and intonation comprehensible?
