= Vieuxtemps Guarneri =

Italian violin made circa 1741

The Vieuxtemps Guarneri is a violin built by the renowned Italian instrument maker Giuseppe Guarneri around 1741. One of the last built by Bartolomeo Giuseppe Guarneri, this Guarneri del Gesù instrument gained its name after being owned by the Belgian 19th century violinist Henri Vieuxtemps. The instrument was later used by Yehudi Menuhin, Itzhak Perlman and Pinchas Zukerman. Past owners of the instrument have included Sir Isaac Wolfson and Ian Stoutzker.

The violin has been meticulously maintained and is considered to be in great condition. Without cracks and having never required patching, it is an excellent example of various principles of standing waves in string instruments. Its initial craftsmanship and resulting sound, in addition to its well-documented provenance and careful maintenance, has led it to a steady increase in price over the years. It has often been viewed as an investment, leaving some to criticize the overall trend of musical instruments gathering dust in a museum rather than being played as intended. In 2012, J&A Beares Ltd sold the instrument, in collaboration with Paolo Alberghini and Julie Reed Yeboah, for an undisclosed sum to an unnamed client. The undisclosed sum was reported to exceed that of the earlier world record price for the "Lady Blunt" violin. The purchaser subsequently provided lifetime use of the instrument to American violinist Anne Akiko Meyers for performance. In a December 3, 2013 article, The Economist reported that the purchase price of the "Vieuxtemps" violin exceeded $16m (£10.5m).
