= Giuseppe Guarneri =

Italian luthier (1698–1744)

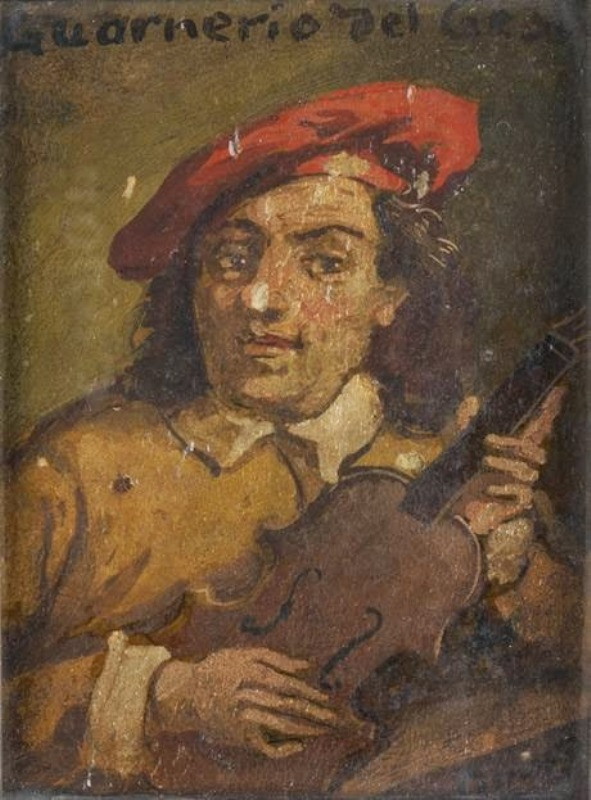
Unauthenticated portrait of Guarneri dated to 18th century

Bartolomeo Giuseppe "del Gesù" Guarneri (/ɡwɑːrˈnɛəri/, UK also /-ˈnɪər-/, Italian: [dʒuˈzɛppe ɡwarˈnɛːri]; 21 August 1698 – 17 October 1744) was an Italian luthier from the Guarneri family of Cremona. He rivals Antonio Stradivari (1644–1737) with regard to the respect and reverence accorded his instruments, and for many prominent players and collectors his instruments are the most coveted of all. Instruments made by Guarneri are often referred to as Del Gesùs.

Guarneri is known as del Gesù (literally "of Jesus") because his labels after 1731 incorporated the nomen sacrum, IHS (iota-eta-sigma) and a cross fleury. His instruments diverged significantly from family tradition, becoming uniquely his own style. They are considered equal in quality to those of Stradivari, and claimed by some to be superior. Guarneri's violins often have a darker, more robust, and more sonorous tone than Stradivari's. Fewer than 200 of Guarneri's instruments survive. They are all violins, although one cello bearing his father's label, dated 1731, seems to have been completed by del Gesù. The quality and scarcity of his instruments have resulted in sale prices in excess of US$10 million.

An asteroid has been named 19185 Guarneri in his honour.

== Violin maker ==
The most illustrious member of the house of Guarneri, Bartolomeo was the son of Giuseppe Giovanni Battista, thus the grandson of Andrea Guarneri, both noted violin makers themselves. Andrea learned his trade as an apprentice of Nicolò Amati, to whom Stradivari was also apprenticed. Undoubtedly, Giuseppe learned the craft of violinmaking in his father's shop.

Giuseppe Guarneri's style has been widely copied by luthiers since the 19th century. Guarneri's career is a great contrast to that of Stradivari, who was stylistically consistent, very careful about craftsmanship and finish, and evolved the design of his instruments in a deliberate way over seven decades. Guarneri's career was short, from the late 1720s until his death in 1744. Initially he was thought to be a man of restless creativity, judging by his constant experimentation with f-holes, arching, thicknesses of the top and back and other design details. However, what has become clear is that, like other members of his family, he was so commercially overshadowed by his illustrious and business-savvy neighbor, Antonio Stradivari, that he was unable to command prices commensurate with his rival, hence needed to make more instruments and work hastily. Indeed, two of the five violin makers of the Guarneri family, the two Pietros—of different generations—left Cremona, the first for Mantua, the second for Venice, apparently because business prospects in Cremona were so stunted by the presence of Stradivari. From the 1720s until about 1737, Guarneri's work is quick and accurate, although he was not overly concerned with quality of finish. However, from the late 1730s until his death, his work shows increasing haste and lack of patience with the time needed to achieve a high quality finish. Some of his late violins from circa 1742 to 1744 have scrolls that can be crudely carved, the purfling hastily inserted, the f-holes unsymmetrical and jagged.

Nonetheless, many of these late violins, in spite of the seeming haste and carelessness of their construction, possess a glorious tone and have been much coveted by soloists. His output falls off rather dramatically in the late 1730s, and the eccentricity of the works following that period gave rise to the romantic notion that he had been imprisoned for killing a rival violin maker (actually it was one of the *Lavazza brothers in Milan to whom this occurred) *["Antonio Maria Lavazza 1683 – 26 October 1708, son of Pietro Antonio Lavazza, died in a dispute with Giovanni Battista Grancino, son of the elder Giovanni Grancino" "Giovanni Battista was sentenced to death in 1708. He escaped execution by going into hiding and was eventually pardoned" Tarisio], and even the unlikely fiction that he made violins in prison. Such stories were invented during the nineteenth century and were repeated by the biographers of the Guarneri family, the Hills, in their 1931 work; while the Hills did not take them at face-value, it did feed into their idea that Giuseppe Guarneri del Gesù must have been temperamental and mercurial, rather than simply overworked and commercially unsuccessful. More recent data shows that business was so bad during the later period of his life that he had to relegate violin-making to the sideline and earn his living as an innkeeper (refuting the "prison" myth).

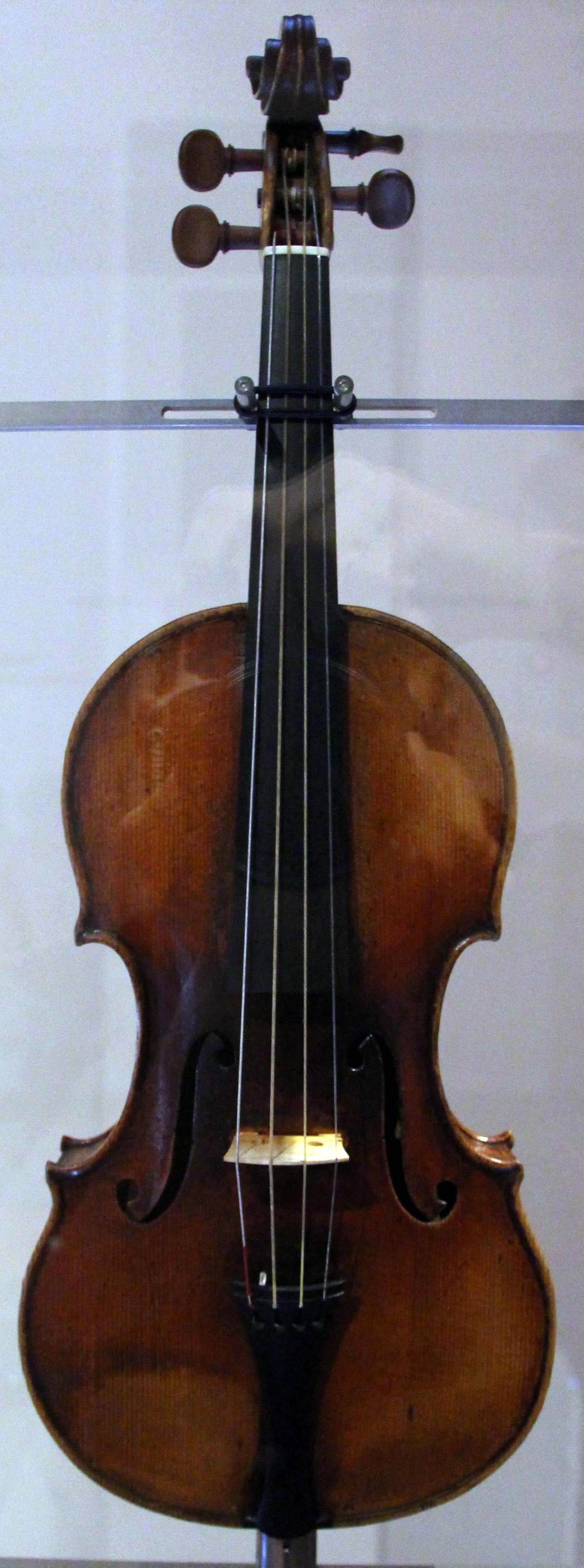
Violin Il Cannone, once owned by Niccolò Paganini

It has also become known that some of the violins emanating from his shop and bearing his label were actually the work of his German wife, Catarina Guarneri, who apparently returned to Germany after her husband's death in 1744. While every other member of his family, the Stradivari family, Nicolò Amati, and a peculiarly large number of makers, lived long lives—Stradivari living and working to age 93—Guarneri died at only 46. There is thus the possibility that the odd qualities of finish in his later instruments—ironically, those most highly prized and expensive—were due not only to stress and haste but also to encroaching illness. It is also worth noting that the tone of both Stradivari and Guarneri did not come into their own until late in the 18th century, that the high-built instruments of Amati and Stainer were the only ones prized during the 18th century. While it is true that players, then as now, preferred old instruments, Stradivari made one of the handsomest livings of all violin makers during his lifetime. It is also customary to conflate Stradivari and Guarneri in this regard, but even the Hills hinted that such was not the case in their styles, the Guarneri always bearing traces of Amati, and even Stainer, the latter Stradivari "would have none of." Moreover, Guarneri's instruments were recognized by a world-class soloist three decades before Stradivari's were likewise championed; by the 1750s, Gaetano Pugnani is known to have acquired and preferred a Giuseppe Guarneri del Gesù violin, but it is not until the 1780s that his pupil, Giovanni Battista Viotti, became an advocate of Stradivari instruments. Of course, Pugnani's advocacy is usually forgotten when Niccolò Paganini became the most noted Giuseppe Guarneri player three generations later.

Accomplished violinists such as Salvatore Accardo, Sarah Chang, Nikki Chooi, Timothy Chooi, Kyung-wha Chung, Eugene Fodor, Augustin Hadelich, Jascha Heifetz, Yi-Jia Susanne Hou, Joseph Joachim, Leila Josefowicz, Nigel Kennedy, Leonid Kogan, Henning Kraggerud, Fritz Kreisler, Gidon Kremer, Yang Liu, Kerson Leong, Robert McDuffie, Anne Akiko Meyers, Midori, Elmar Oliveira, Ruth Palmer, Itzhak Perlman, Rachel Barton Pine, Maud Powell, Michael Rabin, Aaron Rosand, Charlie Siem, Marie Soldat, Isaac Stern, Elly Suh, Henryk Szeryng, Arve Tellefsen, Richard Tognetti, Uto Ughi, Henri Vieuxtemps, Tianwa Yang, Eugène Ysaÿe, Florian Zabach, Zvi Zeitlin, and Pinchas Zukerman, have used Guarneri del Gesù violins at one point in their career or even exclusively.

Virtuoso Niccolò Paganini's favorite violin, Il Cannone Guarnerius of 1743, and the Lord Wilton of 1742, once owned by Yehudi Menuhin, are del Gesù instruments. In addition, the Vieuxtemps Guarneri—once owned by Henri Vieuxtemps—was sold in 2013 close to its asking price of US$18 million, making it the most expensive instrument in the world. Jascha Heifetz owned a c. 1740 Guarneri del Gesù from the 1920s until his death in 1987. It was his favorite instrument, even though he owned several Stradivarius. One of Norwegian virtuoso Ole Bull's favorite instrument was the del Gesù violin of 1744 named after Bull, which is also believed to be the last work of Guarneri del Gesù.

== Instrument list ==
(From the Cozio Archive)

- Billotet-Guilet, c. 1715–22, Cozio 40680
- Titan, Möller, Moskowsky, c. 1715–22, Cozio 61284
- Folinari, c. 1715–22, Cozio 32443
- Rappoldi, Campbell, c. 1715–22, Cozio 49179
- Marteau Habisreuthinger, c.1715–22, Cozio 45112
- Frank, Sin, Tonhalle, c. 1715–22, Cozio 44918
- Chang, 1717, purchased by Sarah Chang from Isaac Stern. This violin does not appear in the Cozio Archive list for Bartolomeo Giuseppe Guarneri "del Gesù" at Tarisio.com.
- Milstein, Herrmann, Moennig, c. 1722–26, Cozio 49611
- NY Philharmonic, c. 1722–26, Cozio 45560
- Möller, Samsung, c. 1722–26, Cozio 41155
- Count de Vière-Cheremetieff, Balokovic, c. 1725–29, Cozio 43700
- Zimmermann, Aerson, c. 1725–29, Cozio 44520
- Prnjat 1726, now in the RTCG
- Colin, Kogan, 1726, Cozio 40682
- Lord Red, 1727, Cozio 40361
- Dancla, Serato, c. 1726–29, Cozio 40409
- Milstein, Nathan, 1727, Cozio (previously listed)
- Robberechts (Robrecht), 1728, Cozio 44054
- Corti, Tolstopiatow, Lvoff, c. 1728, Cozio 42441
- Kubelik, von Vecsey, c. 1728, Cozio 71858, used by Alexandra Conunova
- 'Lady Stretton', 1728–29, Cozio 40126 used by Albert Stern and Elmar Oliveira
- Cobbett, Downs, c. 1729, Cozio 60188
- Baron Heath, 1729, Cozio 42986
- Briggs, 1730, Cozio 61283
- Baron Vitta, c. 1730, Cozio 40391
- David, Payne, c. 1730, Cozio 40388
- Pluvié, Champonay, Kahn, c. 1730, Cozio 40392
- Lord Shaftsbury, c. 1730–31, Cozio 47533
- Castelbarco-Tarisio, c. 1732, Cozio 43676, now in collection at the Chimei Museum. Yu-Chien Tseng (at age 20) won the silver prize (gold not awarded) at the 2015 XV International Tchaikovsky Competition with this violin.
- 'The Cathedral', George Enescu, 1731. In 2008, after a competition organized by the Romanian Ministry of Culture and Religious Affairs and the Romanian National Museum "George Enescu", the violin has been entrusted to violinist Gabriel Croitoru and is again played in concerts.
- Messeas (Cello), 1731, Cozio 40385
- Baltic, 1731, Cozio 40410
- Sorkin, Mischakoff, 1731, Cozio 42178
- Marteau, Habisreuthinger, 1731, Cozio 45112, owned by Henri Marteau, then Gérard Poulet and used by Maxim Vengerov.
- Huberman, 1731, used by Midori Goto, on lifetime loan from the Hayashibara Foundation
- Stanley Goodman, c. 1731, Cozio 41968
- Geneva, Turettini, c. 1731, Cozio 47740
- Lo Stauffer, Zukerman, c. 1731, Cozio 40803
- Gibson, Huberman, 1731, Cozio 40406
- Armingaud/Fernández Blanco, 1732, on display at Mueso de Arte Hispanoamericano "Isaac Fernández Blanco", Buenos Aires, Argentina
- Ferni, 1732, Cozio 47698
- Adolphe Sax, 1732, now in the Paris Conservatory of Music
- Posselt, Phillip, 1732, owned by Ruth Posselt, now in a private collection
- Mayseder, 1732, Cozio 42355
- Kreisler, Nachez, 1732, Cozio 40549
- Balokovic, Haupt, 1732, Cozio 40397
- Pixis, 1732, Cozio 43699
- Smith, Briggs, c. 1732, Cozio 40381
- Rode, von Heyder, c. 1732, Cozio 40389
- Jean Becker, 1732, Cozio 43270
- Gillot, Lord Dunmore, c. 1732, Cozio 40395
- Dittrich, c. 1732, Cozio 40218
- Plotenyi, Remenyi, 1732, Cozio 40394
- Parlow, Henryk Kaston, 1732, Cozio 41966
- Fritz Kreisler, 1733, Cozio 40400, given to Library of Congress in 1952
- Lafont-Siskovsky, 1733, Cozio 40399
- Consolo, 1733, Cozio 44397, used by Liya Petrova
- 1733, Cozio 47475
- Soil, 1733, Cozio 42723
- Hämmerle, 1733, Cozio 43920
- Prince Doria, 1733–34, Cozio 46922, acquired by the Doria Family from Jacquot of Paris in 1860
- Haddock, 1734, Cozio 40411
- Spagnoletti, 1734, Cozio 46715
- Rode, 1734, Cozio 40404
- Heberlein, le Guillet, 1734, Cozio 49613
- Pugnani, 1734, Cozio 40402
- Ferni, duc de Camposelice, 1734, Cozio 43826
- 1734, Cozio 61313
- 1734, Diable
- Hart, Kreisler, c. 1734, Cozio 40551
- Lo Stauffer, 1734, displayed by the City of Cremona
- Plowden, 1735, Cozio 40418
- Sennhauser, 1735, Cozio 40089
- David, 1735, Cozio 40618
- Parlow, Viotti, 1735, Cozio 40420
- Ladenburg, Odnoposoff, 1735, Cozio 40121
- Antoncich, Ward, 1735, Cozio 40450
- Chardon (Small Violin), 1735, Cozio 40421
- 'The King', 1735, Cozio 40407, now in the Croatian Academy of Sciences and Arts
- Kubelik, Ferni, 1735, Cozio 40419, used by Kyung-Wha Chung
- Ladenburg, 1735, played by Robert McDuffie
- Mary Portman, 1735, Cozio 40088, on loan to Ben Beilman (from Clement and Karen Arrison through the Stradivari Society of Chicago)
- d'Egville, Prince Wilhelm of Prussia, Menuhin, 1735, Cozio 40417. Now in collection of David L. Fulton.
- Wieniawski, 1736, Cozio 43840
- Muntz, Bustabo, 1736, Cozio 49615
- Count Cessol, 1736, Cozio 40422
- Pollitzer, Koessler, 1736, Cozio 43519
- Lafont, c. 1736, Cozio 41035
- Paulsen, 1737, Cozio 47249
- Joachim, 1737, Cozio 40412
- Zimbalist, 1737, Cozio 48357
- 'King Joseph', 1737, Cozio 40213, reportedly the first Guarnerius del Gesù to go to America in 1868, now in collection of David L. Fulton
- Lipinski, 1737, owned by Daniel Hope
- Isaac Stern, Panette, Balatre, 1737, Cozio 40214. Once in the collection of David L. Fulton, now owned by a banking institution in Lugano, and used by Renaud Capuçon
- Fountaine, 1738, Cozio 47065
- Kemp, Emperor, 1738, Cozio 40426. Now in collection of David L. Fulton.
- Haas, Soriano, 1738, Cozio 45258
- Adam, Wurlitzer, 1738, Cozio 40425, played by Vesko Eschkenazy
- Maggio, Huberman, 1738, Cozio 66000
- Baron Gutmann, Baron Knoop, c. 1738, Cozio 42440
- Kortschak, Wurlitzer, Hammig, Spanish Joseph, 1739, Cozio 40428
- Museum, 1739, Cozio 43701
- Ebersholt, Menuhin, 1739, Cozio 40595, in collection of Kunsthistorisches Museum
- Beare, Steinhardt, 1739, Cozio 49617
- Bower, Druian, 1739, Cozio 44345
- 1739, Cozio 61377. Now in private collection of an anonymous German and lent to Lisa Batiashvili.
- Read, 1739, Now in collection of Shozo Nakajima
- Lutti, Senn, 1740, Cozio 40430
- Fountaine (Small Violin), 1740, Cozio 4327
- Ysaÿe, 1740, Cozio 40064, used by Isaac Stern, now belonging to Nippon Music Foundation
- David, 1740, used by Jascha Heifetz, now in the San Francisco Legion of Honor Museum
- Casadesus, c. 1740, Cozio 48178
- Pestel, Menuhin, c. 1740, Cozio 49624
- Rebner, Bonjour, c. 1740, Cozio 40432
- Heifetz, David, c. 1740, Cozio 40097
- Baron d'Erlanger, c. 1740–41, Cozio 45387
- Kochánski, 1741, Cozio 42807, used by Aaron Rosand, sold for about $10 million in 2009
- Carrodus, 1741, Cozio 40255
- Henry Holst, 1741, Cozio 44998
- Playfair, 1741, Cozio 50382
- 1741, Cozio 49618
- Doubleday, Duvette, 1741 (in Ingles & Hayday catalogue)
- Vieuxtemps, 1741, called the "Mona Lisa" of violins, Cozio 40433. Owned by a private collector who bequeathed lifetime use of the instrument for performances to violinist Anne Akiko Meyers.
- Vieuxtemps, Wilmotte, c. 1741, Cozio 50024
- Duc de Camposelice, c. 1741, Cozio 40548
- c. 1741 "Titan," on loan to Canadian-American violinist Timothy Chooi
- Lipinski, c. 1742, Cozio 40424
- Moser, 1742, Hamma & Co. Cozio 48180
- Wieniawski, 1742, Cozio 40090, on loan to Taiwanese-American violinist Paul Huang (2015 Avery Fisher Career Grant recipient) through the Stradivari Society.
- Donaldson, McAllister, Sorobin, c. 1742, Cozio 40429
- Segelman, 1742, Cozio 40623
- Tellefsen, 1742, Cozio 40403
- Dragonetti, Walton, 1742, Cozio 43830
- Benno Rabinof, 1742, Cozio 55051
- Alard, 1742, Cozio 40444, now in Cité de la Musique, Paris
- Lord Wilton, 1742, Cozio 40256, used by Yehudi Menuhin, now in collection of David L. Fulton
- Dushkin, 1742, Cozio 40446, used by Pinchas Zukerman
- Rovelli, 1742, used by Liya Petrova
- Bazzini, Soldat, 1742, Cozio 40445, used by Rachel Barton Pine
- Brusilow, 1743, Cozio 49626
- Spalding, 1743, Cozio 45063
- Sauret, 1743, Cozio 40253
- Burmester, Kanarievogel, Hammerle, 1743, Cozio 42987
- Baron Heath, 1743, Cozio 43582
- Il Cannone, 1743, Cozio 40130, used by Niccolò Paganini, now in the City Hall of Genoa
- Carrodus, Hottinger, 1743, Cozio 40447, used by Richard Tognetti.
- Leduc, c. 1744, Cozio 40448, used by Henryk Szeryng, since 2019 played by Augustin Hadelich
- Sainton, Betti, c. 1744, Cozio 40434
- Doyen, 1744, Cozio 40436, currently held by Henry Ford Foundation
- Edith Lorand, Columbus, Terminator, 1744, Cozio 49625
- Prince of Orange, Wald, Hoffmann, 1744, Cozio 42581, displayed by the Prague National Museum
- Lord Coke, 1744, Cozio 40415
- de Bériot, 1744, Cozio 43991
- Cariplo, Hennel, Rosé, 1744, used by Arthur Grumiaux Cozio 41962
- Ole Bull, 1744, Cozio 40453, now in collection at the Chimei Museum, acquired in 1992. In catalogue of Ingles & Hayday and Artes-Violins, Milano, 2010. One of Ole Bull's favorite violins, it is also believed to be the last work of Guarneri del Gesù.
