= Mirecki =

Mirecki is the surname of:

- Aleksander Mirecki, Polish violinist
- Franciszek Mirecki, Polish composer, music conductor, and music teacher
- José Luis de Mirecki Ruiz-Casaux, Spanish economist
- Lee Mirecki, United States Navy Airman Recruit killed during a military training exercise
- Maurice de Mirecki, French pianist, violinist and composer
- Víctor Mirecki Larramat, Spanish cellist and music teacher of Franco-Polish origin
