= Juan María Guelbenzu Fernández =

Spanish pianist

Juan María Guelbenzu Fernández was a Spanish pianist and composer.

== Biography ==
He was born in Pamplona, Navarra 27 December 1819. Juan had been close with composers Chopin, Thalberg and Liszt. He started to study piano at Pamplona and then at the Madrid Conservatory, where he won the piano prize. After that, he moved on a scholarship to Paris. In 1841 he replaced Pedro Albéniz as organist at the Royal Palace of Madrid. He was the piano teacher for the Infanta Isabel, Countess of Girgenti and her sisters.

Fernández had been Involved in the development of Spanish symphony and in the promotion of German music. On November 13, 1844, he played piano four hands with Franz Liszt at the Teatro del Príncipe(now the Teatro Español (Madrid)), in Madrid. During this time, he also came in contact with the composer Mikhail Glinka while his visit to Barcelona. He co-founded the Sociedad de Cuartetos in 1863 with Jesús de Monasterio, of which he was a regular pianist.

Fernández also developed a remarkable career as a composer, working from Romanticism and to Spanish musical nationalism. He assiduously used the Zortziko and the Jota as cultured musical forms, highlighting among his works intimate pieces for piano, such as En la cuna (Canto para mi hijo) or Romanza sin Palabras. He was the member of the Music section of the Real Academia de Bellas Artes de San Fernando. King Alfonso XII awarded him the great cross of the Order of Isabella the Catholic, and the King of Portugal made him a Knight of the Order of the Immaculate Conception of Vila Viçosa. His entire musical works are kept in the Biblioteca Nacional de España.

He died on January 8, 1886, in Madrid. The name of a street in his hometown Pamplona, was dedicated to him in his memory.

== Notes ==
- Ugalde, Martín de. Historia de Euskadi. Spain, Cupsa, 1981.
- Folkart, Jessica A.. Angles on Otherness in Post-Franco Spain: The Fiction of Cristina Fernández Cubas. United Kingdom, Bucknell University Press, 2002.
- Sherzer, William M.. The Spanish Literary Generation of 1968: José María Guelbenzu, Lourdes Ortiz, and Ana María Moix. United States, University Press of America, 2012.
- Bouju, Emmanuel. Réinventer la littérature: démocratisation et modèles romanesques dans l'Espagne post-franquiste. France, Presses universitaires du Mirail, 2002.
- Royer, Lydie. José Maria Guelbenzu: Un rénovateur de l'écriture du roman espagnol contemporain : du roman expérimentaliste, el mercurio, 1968, au roman d'intrigue, no acosen al asesino, 2001. France, Publibook, 2007.
- Santa Cecilia, Carlos G.. La recepción de James Joyce en la prensa española: 1921–1976. Spain, Universidad de Sevilla, Secretariado de Publicaciones, 1997.
