= Aleksander Mirecki =

Polish violinist

- Birth name: Antoine Aleksander Mirecki
- Born: 13 April 1809; Chrzanów, Poland
- Died: 18 November 1882 (aged 73); Madrid, Spain
- Occupation: Violinist
- Instrument: Violin

Antoine Aleksander Mirecki (13 April 1809 – 18 November 1882) was a Polish violinist.

Mirecki was born in 1809 in Chrzanów, but he lived in Kraków with his mother, Françoise Kutzkowska, and his young father, the half-brother of the teacher and composer Franciszek Wincenty Mirecki. In 1826 he went to Warsaw and began military training. He participated in the November Uprising, when he was teaching in the Military Academy. He fought in the disturbances of Warsaw, with heroic attitude, and fled from the subsequent persecution to France by the end of 1831, in the Great Emigration, leaving his family in Kraków. Along with other young people of the Polish nobility, Louis Philip of Orleans was received in the Court of Paris, and named Marischal of the Polish Legion to service of the king of France. He participated in political Polish life during the French exile, with Adam Jerzy Czartoryski, in the Hôtel Lambert.

Towards 1840 he laid down arms and was transferred to the south of France along with Adam Jerzy Czartoryski and other members of the Polish Legion, and he settled soon first in Pau and in Tarbes (Hautes-Pyrénées), as a violin professor. An important community of minor Polish nobility settled then in that region. There, he married Marie Zelinne Larramat, a Huguenot (28 October 1844). They had three children: Maurice (1845), Victor (1847) and Françoise (1850). In 1857 Mirecki occupied the chair of violin in the Conservatory of Bordeaux, where he was transferred with his family. They resided there until his retirement.

A great friend of Adrien François Servais and Henri Vieuxtemps, Mirecki initiated his two older children into the art of music. In 1881 he and his wife went to Madrid to reside with their son Victor, in which city the elder Mirecki died on 18 November 1882. He is buried in Madrid.
