= Lisa Cristiani =

French cellist (1827–1853)

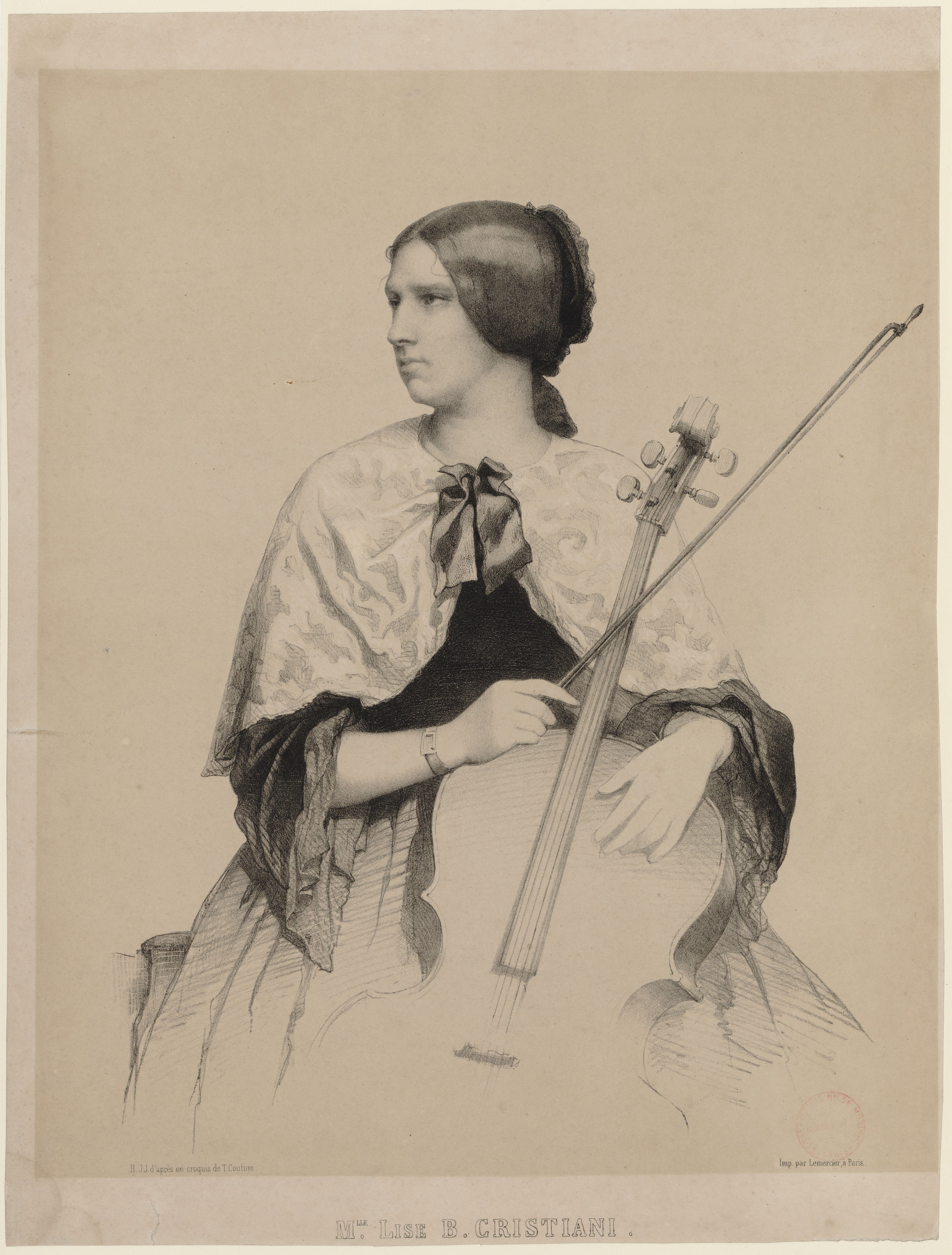

Background information
- Born: 4 December 1825; Paris, France
- Died: 14 October 1853 (aged 27) Tobolsk, Russia
- Genres: Classical music
- Occupation: Musician
- Instrument: Cello
- Years active: 1845-1853

Lisa Barbier Cristiani (December 4, 1825 – October 14, 1853), also known as Lise Cristiani or Elise Cristiani, was a French cellist and performer known for being one of the earliest recorded instances of a woman becoming a professional in the field.

== Childhood ==
Born in Paris, it is believed that Cristiani was of Italian descent, though little more is known of her early years. She did eventually become a cello apprentice to Edouard Benazet and had her concert debut on February 14, 1845 at the Salle des Concerts Herz.

== Professional life ==
Cristiani was one of the earliest professional female musical performers of her era and began playing numerous concerts in her late teenage years. The early tours she conducted included stops at Vienna, Linz, Ratisbon, Baden-Baden, and Hamburg. The last in Hamburg resulted in such a popular fervor for her that her portrait (shown above) became a highly sought after item. Her level of play caught the attention of and the support of composer Felix Mendelssohn in 1845 during a concert in Leipzig. A piece for the cello in Mendelssohn's series Songs Without Words was dedicated to her the same year (Opus 109), though it was published after Mendelssohn's death and not included in the original books.

After this period, Cristiani began a musical tour of Europe that resulted in further fame and her eventual travel to Russia where she played for a number of concerts. During this time period, the King of Denmark Frederick VII awarded her the title of Chamber Virtuosa.

Several years later, in 1852, while visiting the home of historian Nikolai Markevitch in Kiev, she met fellow cellist Adrien-François Servais. The three of them spent some time in the city practising their music with each other and Cristiani's association with Servais only heightened her fame in the region.

== Death ==
Not long after, in the fall of 1853, she began a new trek across the Siberian wilderness to the Kamchatka Peninsula for another tour in the region, being the first European to give public concerts in the remote cities of the North Asian continent. Her original plan was to finish in Kamchatka and then head to the Caucasus for another concert tour. However, she contracted cholera after performing in the small town of Tobolsk, and therefore had to stay in the village, and died there on October 14, 1853.

== Influence on cello design and use ==
Because of how the cello is played, with the large frame between one's legs, the women's fashion of the era of dresses made playing the instrument directly impossible. The alternative, having the frame in a side saddle position, makes playing difficult. So it was not until the development of the endpin to lift the frame off the floor that play by women became more common. It has been claimed in various publications that Cristiani may have been a primary early popularizer of the endpin and led to its increased use in Europe and the rise of a new wave of female cellists in the decades after her death.

Cristiani was also well known for the uniqueness of her cello, a 1700 Stradivarius with her name carved into the side. Due to this engraving, the instrument eventually became known as the "Cristiani", along with a general style of Stradivari cello inheriting the name. After her death, the cello that she played was obtained by Hugo Becker. It was then bought in 2005 to be returned to the original place of its concert debut in Cremona and displayed at the Walter Stauffer Musicological Foundation of Cremona, before being moved to the Museo del Violino of Cremona.

== Documentary ==
- Sol Gabetta and Lise Christiani, Virtuoso Cellists and Intrepid Travellers (2024) directed by Simone Jung, Arte.
