= Víctor Mirecki Larramat =

Spanish cellist (1847–1921)

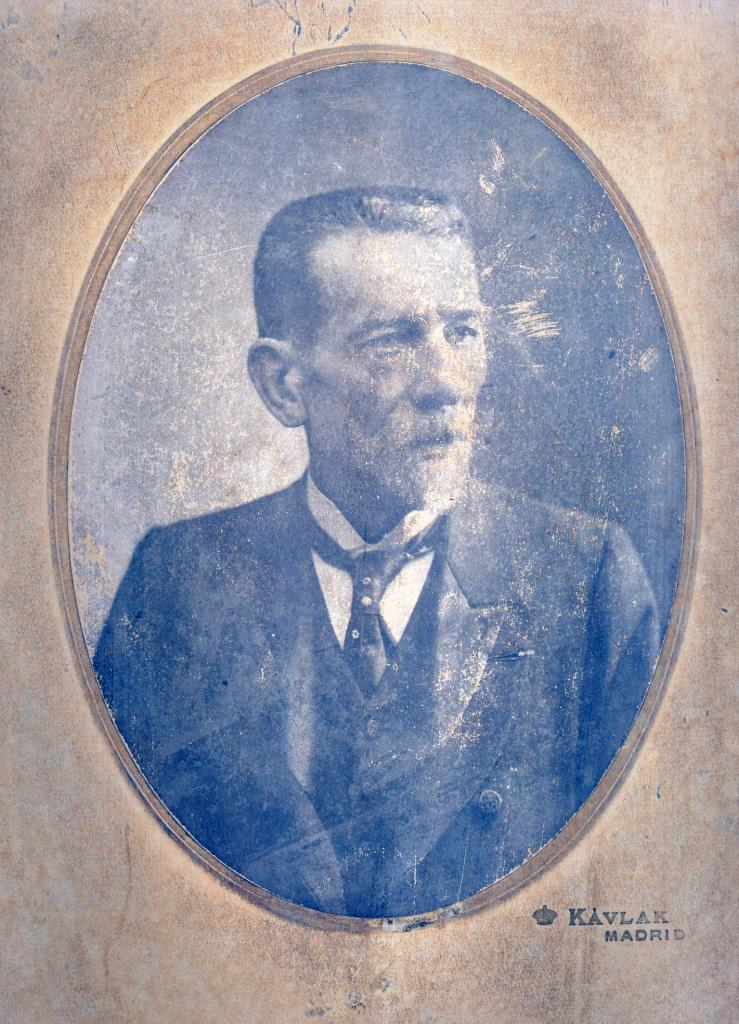
- Photograph by Kaulak (1908)
- Born: 21 July 1847; Tarbes, France
- Died: 7 April 1921 (aged 73); Madrid, Spain

Víctor Alexander Marie Mirecki Larramat (21 July 1847 – 7 April 1921) was a Spanish cellist and music teacher of Franco-Polish origin. He was born in Tarbes, France and died in Madrid, Spain.

== Introduction ==
Víctor Mirecki was one of the most versatile concert performers of the late 19th and early 20th centuries. A prominent figure in Madrid's musical and cultural circles, he maintained extensive social and artistic connections, and was recognized for his distinctive interpretative style as a cellist, as well as for his work as a chamber musician and teacher. His work with Jesús de Monasterio in the Quartet Society of Madrid (Spanish: Sociedad de Quartetos de Madrid) greatly influenced the Spanish music of the era, promoting contemporary European chamber music, and contributing to the dissemination of the work of emerging Spanish composers, including Manuel de Falla.

His dedication to teaching in the National School of Music, later known as the Madrid Royal Conservatory, contributed to the development of a new generation of Spanish cellists and to the advancement of cello technique in Spain. He, together with Belgian cellist Adrien-François Servais and French cellist Auguste Franchomme, founded the Spanish school of cellists. Its most notable later students would include Pablo Casals, Juan Ruiz Casaux (later Mirecki's son-in-law), and Augustín Rubio.

== Childhood and youth in France ==
Son of the Polish Aleksander Mirecki and of Marie Zelinne Larramat, Víctor grew up in a notable musical environment. His father, marshal and hero of the November Uprising against Russia, had taken refuge in France. After a stay in Paris, his father moved to Tarbes, where he taught violin. His three sons, Víctor, Maurice and Françoise, were born there, and they all eventually became dedicated to music. In 1857, at the age of ten, Víctor moved with his family to Bordeaux, where his father taught the violin as a professor of the Conservatory. There he began his studies for a military career in the Lycée.

In April 1862, the cellist Adrien-François Servais and the violinist Henri Vieuxtemps were visiting Bordeaux and were sheltered in the Mirecki house. Impressed by these masters' performance and ability to interpret, the young Víctor, along with his brother Maurice, dedicated themselves to the cello for the next two years, under the supervision of their father. Víctor's natural talent was outstanding, and in March 1864, at 17 years of age, he played as a soloist in a public concert at the Bordeaux Conservatory in the presence of Servais. Víctor's success was such that Servais convinced Victor's father to allow him to abandon his military studies and dedicate himself completely to his instrument.

At Bordeaux he obtained the first prize and the medal of honor of the Conservatory, and was also granted a scholarship to continue his studies in Paris. He began studying at the Conservatoire de Paris in 1865 and became Auguste Franchomme's star pupil. He obtained the award of honor of the Conservatoire on 6 August 1868, surpassing his classmate Jules Delsart, also a cellist and the future successor of the master Franchomme. During the course of that year, he visited Halle to pay his respects at the grave of his mentor Servais.

With the help of his father and of his master, he also worked diligently in the orchestras of various Parisian theaters, meeting the great composers and musicians of the era who visited Paris; he developed an intimate friendship with Pablo de Sarasate, Édouard Lalo, Camille Saint-Saëns and Jules Massenet.

He died in 1921, aged 73.

His daughter Maria Theresa married his student, the cellist Juan Ruiz Casaux, and his son Alexander married Casaux's sister Carmen.

== Bibliography ==
- “Víctor de Mirecki”, en La Ilustración Musical Hispano-americana, año VIII, n.º 170, 15 de febrero de 1895.
- AGUADO, Ester: La Sociedad de Cuartetos de Madrid (1863–1894). Estudio sobre el origen, organización, desarrollo del repertorio y su aceptación pública, Madrid, 2001.
- BELTRANDO-PATIER, Marie-Claire: Historia de la música. La música occidental desde la Edad Media hasta nuestros días, Espasa-Calpe, Madrid, 1996, p. 702
- HILL, W. Henry; HILL, Arthur F. y HILL, Alfred E.: Antonio Stradivari, his life and work (1644–1737), Londres, 1902.
- PINO, Rafael del: “Víctor de Mirecki: de los salones de París al Palacio Real”, en La Opinión de Granada, 2 de abril de 2006, p. 36.
- SOBRINO, Ramón: “Víctor Mirecki Larramal (sic)” en CASARES, Emilio (dir. y coord.), Diccionario de la música española e hispanoamericana, vol. VII, p. 613. Sociedad General de Autores y Editores. Madrid, 1999-2002.
- PINO, Rafael del: “Víctor de Mirecki: de los salones de París al Palacio Real”, en La Opinión de Granada, 2 de abril de 2006, p. 36.
- VILLAR, Rogelio: La música y los músicos españoles contemporáneos, Madrid, s.n.
- PIERRE, Constant. Le conservatoire national de musique et de déclamation. Documents historiques et administratifs. Paris, Imprimerie nationale, 1900.
