= Servais Stradivarius =

Antique cello

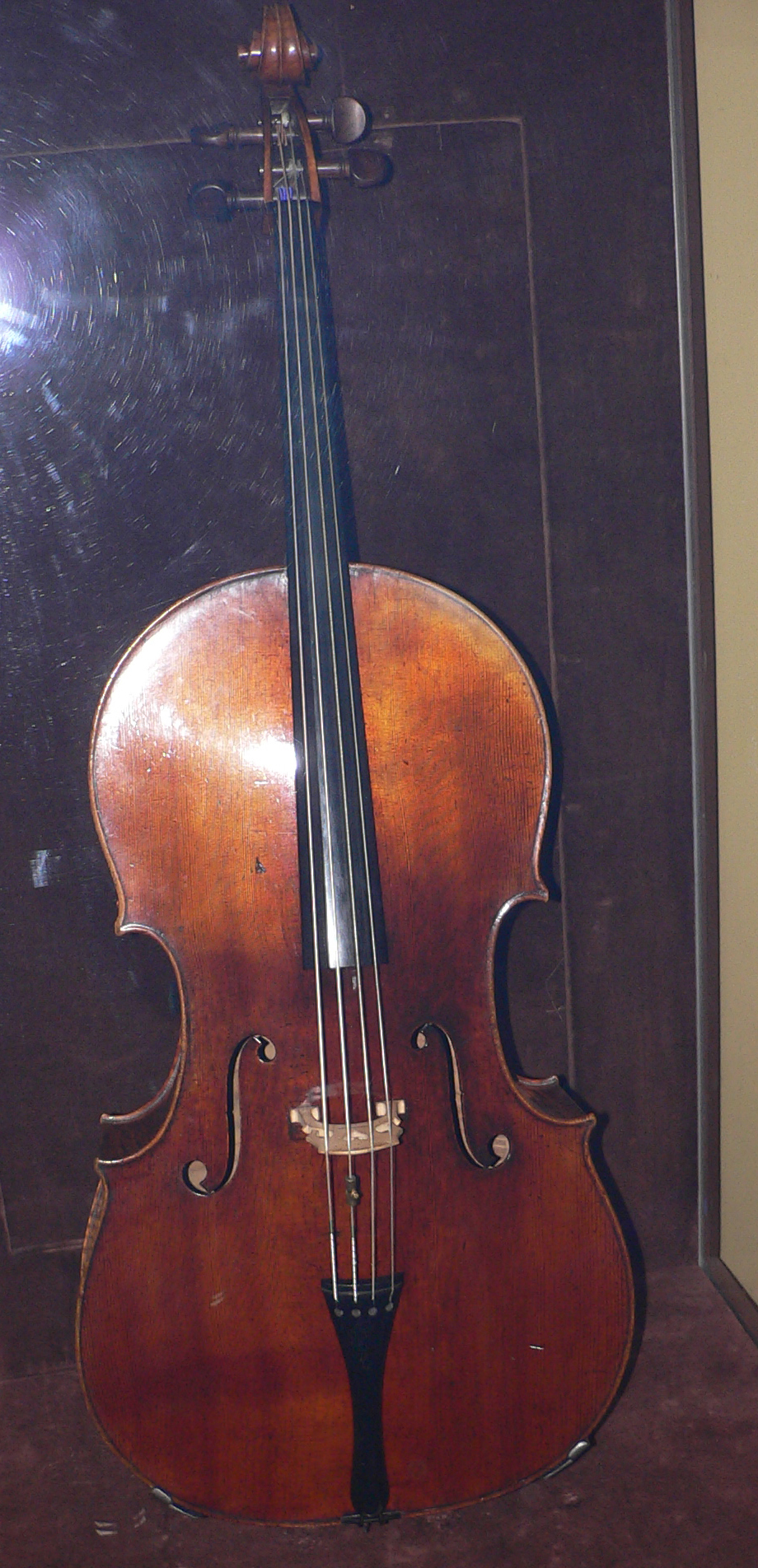
The Servais Stradivarius is preserved in the Smithsonian Institution's National Museum of American History

The Servais Stradivarius is an antique cello crafted in 1701 by Italian luthier Antonio Stradivari of Cremona (1644–1737). One of only sixty-three extant cellos attributed to Stradivari, it was crafted from exceptional wood reserved by the luthier for large instruments. Its varnish has been described as "unusually rich" and the color a reddish-orange with golden transparency. The cello takes its name from the nineteenth-century Belgian cellist, Adrien Francois Servais (1807–1866), who played this cello.

The Servais Stradivarius is currently owned by the Smithsonian Institution's National Museum of American History. The instrument is famous for its remarkable state of preservation—retaining its original 1701 label—and musical excellence. The Russian Prince Yusupov purchased the cello for Servais ca. 1845, and it was subsequently passed to his son. The cello was later donated to the Smithsonian by Charlotte Bergen of New Jersey. Cellist Anner Bylsma used the Servais in his 1992 recording of the J. S. Bach Suites for Unaccompanied Cello.
