= Juan Ruiz Casaux =

Spanish cellist

Juan Antonio Ruiz-Casaux y Lopez de Carvajal, 5th marqués de Atalaya Bermeja, usually known as Juan Ruiz Casaux (23 December 1889 – 16 January 1972) was a noted Spanish cellist and teacher. Along with Pablo Casals and Gaspar Cassadó, he was one of the "Three Cs" of the Spanish cello.

== Early life ==
Juan Ruiz Casaux was born in San Fernando, Cádiz in 1889. His father was Juan Antonio Ruiz y Lopez de Carvajal, an admiral and a mathematician, and the family tradition was for males to receive naval training. After starting out on that path, he soon abandoned it in 1904 when he entered a music competition in Cadiz at which one of the judges was Manuel de Falla. He had earlier had lessons with Salvador Viniegra, a painter, art patron and a cellist of considerable ability, albeit an amateur. After reaching and surpassing Viniega's standard, he entered the Madrid Royal Conservatory to study under Víctor Mirecki Larramat (who was later to become his father-in-law). He was extremely successful, winning a number of prizes, and he chose to continue his studies in Paris under André Hekking.

He moved to Lisbon, Portugal at the start of the First World War, giving many concerts with the Lisbon Symphony Orchestra under Pedro Blanch. He also gave many chamber music concerts with artists such as José Cubiles (cello), Enrique Fernández Arbós (violin), and José Vianna da Motta, Ricardo Viñes, and Fernandez Ortiz (piano).and Bernardo Moreira de Sá (violin) in Sala Mello Abreu (1913,1914..)Juan Ca

In 1915 he was the soloist in the first performance in Spain of Richard Strauss's Don Quixote, under Fernández Arbós (and in 1925 he played the same work under the composer's baton).

== Return to Madrid ==
In 1920 he returned to the Madrid Conservatory as senior professor, remaining there until his retirement in 1962. He sought to create a distinct school of Spanish cello playing and to extend the scope of chamber music. He founded the Hispano-Hungaro Trio with Enrique Iniesta (violin) and Emilio Ember (piano), and the Hispano Trio with Iniesta and Enrique Aroca (piano). In 1940 he also created the Agrupación Nacionál de Música de Camára (National Chamber Music Organization), which consisted apart from himself of Luis Antón and Enrique Garcia (violins), Pedro Meroño (viola), and Enrique Aroca. They played complete cycles of Haydn, Mozart and Beethoven string quartets in recitals, in schools and universities, and on international tours.

On 26 November 1934, along with Iniesta and Ember, he gave the first performance in Spain of Joaquín Turina's Piano Trio No. 2, Op. 76, a broadcast on Radio Madrid.

On 28 December 1944 he participated in the world premiere of Turina's Musas de Andalucia, Op. 93 (1942), a cycle of nine pieces for strings, piano and soprano. The composer played the piano, the soprano was Lola Rodríguez Aragón, and the string players were Iniesta, Antón, Meroño and Aroca.

On 27 May 1945, as a tribute to his 25th anniversary as head of the cello department at the Conservatory, four of his cello students premiered Joaquín Rodrigo's Dos piezas caballerescas for four-piece cello orchestra.

In 1951 he founded the Asociación Española de Música de Cámara, with which he continued to play until 1969. He composed a small number of pieces, including "Six Cello Impromptus".

He died in 1972, aged 82. After his death, his place in the Real Academia de Bellas Artes de San Fernando was assumed by the composer Ernesto Halffter.

== The Stradivarius Palatinos ==
Juan Ruiz Casaux also played an extremely important role in having returned to Spain a Stradivarius viola made in 1696 as part of a set of five matching ornamented instruments and sold to Charles IV of Spain (known as the Stradivarius Palatinos). The viola and one other of the set were looted by the French at the end of the Peninsular War. The fifth instrument was irretrievably lost, but the viola eventually came into the possession of the firm of W.E. Hill & Sons in London. After years of fruitless discussion, including accompanying King Alfonso XIII of Spain to London in 1925 to personally plead Spain's case, Casaux was finally in 1950 able to persuade Hill to sell the viola back to Spain. His group later used this quartet of priceless instruments in concerts at the royal palace and broadcasts.

== Family ==
He married Maria Theresa, the daughter of his Madrid teacher Víctor Mirecki Larramat; and his sister Carmen married Mirecki's son Alejandro Víctor Mirecki Bach.

His second wife was Julia Bazo-Vivó, the mother of his only child, Mary Ruiz Casaux (María Pilar Ruiz-Casaux y Bazo; born 1936), a pianist who was the first to perform all of Johannes Brahms' piano works in Spain.

The economist José Luis de Mirecki Ruiz-Casaux was his nephew.

== Honours ==
In 1961 he inherited the Marquessate of Atalaya Bermeja, becoming the 5th Marquess. His daughter Mary later became the 7th Marquesa. Other honours included Academician of the Royal Academy of Fine Arts of San Fernando, the Academy Paestum in Italy, of the Academy of San Romualdo, and corresponding member of the Spanish-American, Knight of the Order of Carlos III, French Legion of Honor, Order of Merit of Italy, official Order of Saint James of the Sword (Portugal), Commander of the Order of Alfonso X the Wise, and the Order of Merit Jalifiano (Morocco).

Jesús Guridi dedicated his 2nd String Quartet (1949) to Juan Antonio Ruiz Casaux.

== Sources ==
- Grove's Dictionary of Music and Musicians, 5th ed (1954), Vol. II, p. 105
