= Songs Without Words =

Piano compositions by Felix Mendelssohn

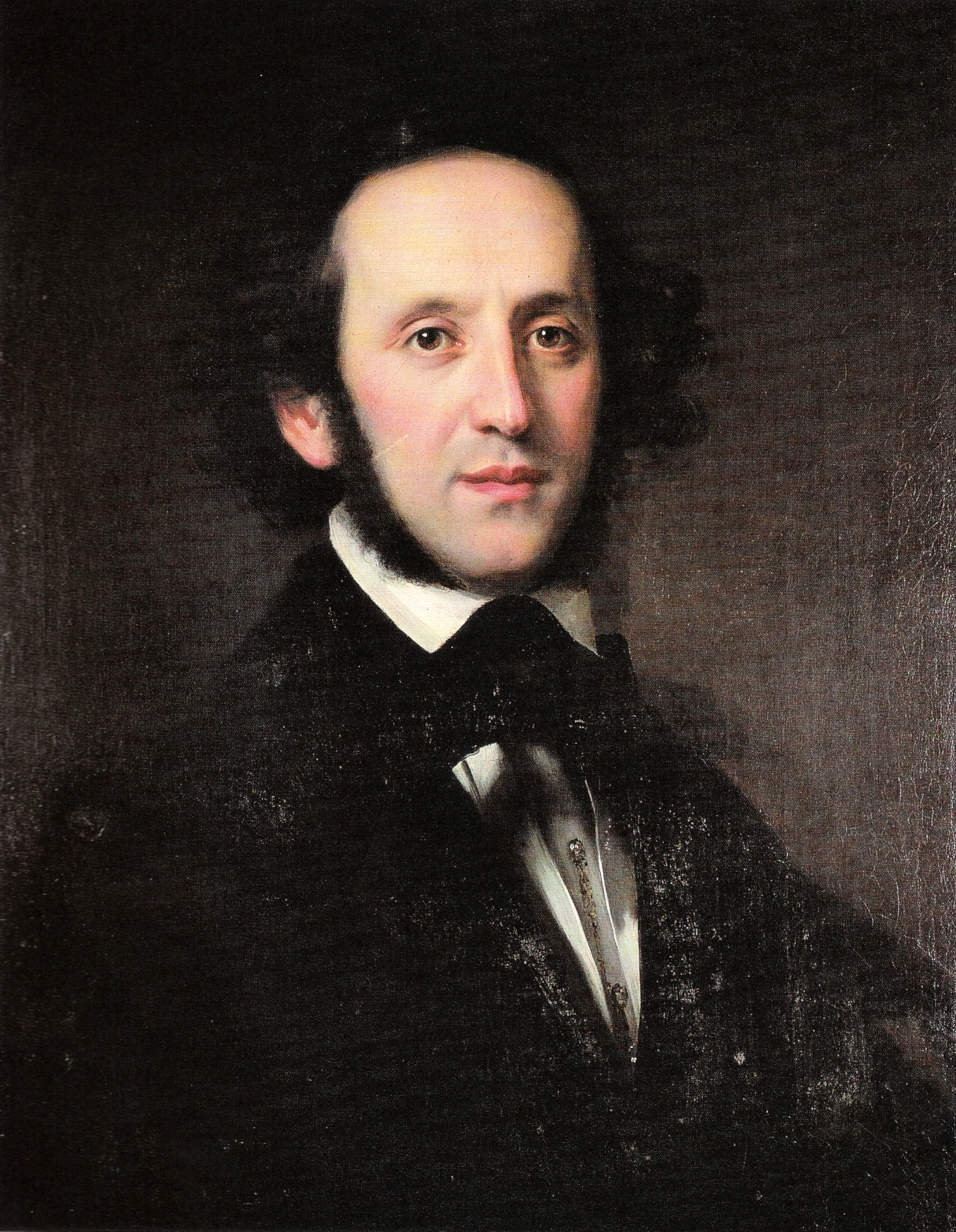
Portrait of Felix Mendelssohn by Eduard Magnus, 1846

Songs Without Words (Lieder ohne Worte) is a series of short lyrical piano works by the Romantic composer Felix Mendelssohn written between 1829 and 1845. His sister, Fanny Mendelssohn, and other composers also wrote pieces in the same genre.

== Music ==
The eight volumes of Songs Without Words, each consisting of six songs (Lieder), were written at various points throughout Mendelssohn's life and published separately. The piano became increasingly popular in Europe during the early nineteenth century, when it became a standard item in many middle-class households. The pieces are accessible to pianists of various abilities.

The first volume was published by Novello in London (1832) as Original Melodies for the Pianoforte, but the later volumes used the title Songs Without Words.

The works were part of the Romantic tradition of writing short lyrical pieces for the piano, although the specific concept of "Songs Without Words" was new. Mendelssohn's sister Fanny wrote a number of similar pieces (though not so entitled) and, according to some music historians, she may have helped inspire the concept. The title Song Without Words seems to have been Felix Mendelssohn's own invention. In 1828, Fanny wrote in a letter "My birthday was celebrated very nicely ... Felix has given me a 'song without words' for my album (he has lately written several beautiful ones)."

Mendelssohn himself resisted attempts to interpret the songs too literally, and objected when his friend Marc-André Souchay sought to put words to them to make them literal: "What the music I love expresses to me, is not thought too indefinite to put into words, but on the contrary, too definite". (Mendelssohn's own italics) Mendelssohn also wrote other Songs Without Words not collected in volumes, and published only in recent years. Furthermore, original drafts exist for many of the 'Songs' many of which differ quite substantially from the eventually published versions. In 2008, the Italian pianist Roberto Prosseda recorded a collection of Mendelssohn's Songs Without Words for Decca Records totalling 56 Lieder, some of them never recorded before.

=== Songs ===
The titles attributed to some of the songs below were given by Mendelssohn himself. Other fanciful titles were given to certain of them by later publishers but have no authority and do not reflect any intention of the composer.

==== Book 1, Op. 19b (1829–30) ====
Op. 19b, No. 1, Andante con moto, MWV U 86

Op. 19b, No. 2, Andante espressivo, MWV U 80

Op. 19b, No. 3, Molto allegro e vivace, MWV U 89

Op. 19b, No. 4, Moderato, MWV U 73

Op. 19b, No. 5, Poco agitato, MWV U 90

Op. 19b, No. 6, Andante sostenuto (Venetian Boat Song No. 1), MWV U 78
Performed by Bernd Krueger

1. Andante con moto (E major), MWV U 86
2. Andante espressivo (A minor), MWV U 80
3. Molto allegro e vivace (A major), MWV U 89
4. Moderato (A major), MWV U 73
5. Poco agitato (F♯ minor), MWV U 90
6. Andante sostenuto: Venetianisches Gondellied ("Venetian Boat Song No. 1") (G minor), MWV U 78

==== Book 2, Op. 30 (1833–34) ====
Op. 30, No. 1, Andante espressivo, MWV U 103

Op. 30, No. 2, Allegro di molto, MWV U 77

Op. 30, No. 3, Adagio non troppo, MWV U 104

Op. 30, No. 4, Agitato e con fuoco, MWV U 98

Op. 30, No. 5, Andante grazioso, MWV U 97
Performed by Bernd Krueger

Op. 30, No. 6, Allegretto tranquillo (Venetian Boat Song No. 2), MWV U 110
Performed by FAE Piano cafe

1. Andante espressivo (E♭ major), MWV U 103
2. Allegro di molto (B♭ minor), MWV U 77
3. Adagio non troppo (E major), MWV U 104
4. Agitato e con fuoco (B minor), MWV U 98
5. Andante grazioso (D major), MWV U 97
6. Allegretto tranquillo: Venetianisches Gondellied ("Venetian Boat Song No. 2") (F♯ minor), MWV U 110

Book 2 was dedicated to Elisa von Woringen.

Song number 2 was written for his sister Fanny to celebrate the birth of her son in 1830.

==== Book 3, Op. 38 (1836–37) ====
Op. 38, No. 1, Con moto, MWV U 121
Performed by FAE Piano cafe

Op. 38, No. 6, Andante con moto (Duet), MWV U 119
Performed by Ruei-Hwa Shyu

1. Con moto (E♭ major), MWV U 121
2. Allegro non troppo (C minor), MWV U 115
3. Presto e molto vivace (E major), MWV U 107
4. Andante (A major), MWV U 120
5. Agitato (A minor), MWV U 137
6. Andante con moto: Duetto ("Duet") (A♭ major), MWV U 119

Song number 6 was given the title Duetto by Mendelssohn, since two melodies were written to represent two singers. It was composed in Frankfurt in June 1836, soon after he had met his future wife.

Book 3 was dedicated to Rosa von Woringen.

==== Book 4, Op. 53 (1839–41) ====
Op. 53, No. 1, Andante con moto, MWV U 143

Op. 53, No. 2, Allegro non troppo, MWV U 109
Performed by FAE Piano cafe

Op. 53, No. 5, Allegro con fuoco (Folksong), MWV U 153
Performed by Bernd Krueger

1. Andante con moto (A♭ major), MWV U 143
2. Allegro non troppo (E♭ major), MWV U 109
3. Presto agitato (G minor), MWV U 144
4. Adagio (F major), MWV U 114
5. Allegro con fuoco: Volkslied ("Folksong") (A minor), MWV U 153
6. Molto allegro vivace (A major), MWV U 154

Book 4 was dedicated to Sophia Horsley.

==== Book 5, Op. 62 (1842–44) ====
Op. 62, No. 1, Andante espressivo, MWV U 185
Performed by FAE Piano cafe

Op. 62, No. 3, Andante maestoso (Funeral march), MWV U 177

Op. 62, No. 4, Allegro con anima, MWV U 175

Op. 62, No. 5, Andante con moto (Venetian Boat Song No. 3), MWV U 151
Performed by Bernd Krueger

Op. 62, No. 6, Allegretto grazioso (Spring Song), MWV U 161
Performed by ROSA Pianist

1. Andante espressivo (G major), MWV U 185
2. Allegro con fuoco (B♭ major), MWV U 181
3. Andante maestoso: Trauermarsch ("Funeral march") (E minor), MWV U 177
4. Allegro con anima (G major), MWV U 175
5. Andante con moto: Venetianisches Gondellied ("Venetian Boat Song") (A minor), MWV U 151
6. Allegretto grazioso: Frühlingslied ("Spring Song") (A major), MWV U 161

Song No. 6 "Spring Song" was also sometimes known in England as "Camberwell Green", being the place in London where Mendelssohn composed it while staying with the Benneckes, relatives of his wife.

Book 5 was dedicated to Clara Schumann.

==== Book 6, Op. 67 (1843–45) ====
Op. 67, No. 1, Andante, MWV U 180
Performed by FAE Piano cafe

Op. 67, No. 2, Allegro leggiero, MWV U 145
Performed by Takashi Sato

Op. 67, No. 3, Andante tranquillo, MWV U 102

Op. 67, No. 4, Presto (Spinner's Song), MWV U 182

Op. 67, No. 6, Allegro non troppo, MWV U 188
Performed by FAE Piano cafe

1. Andante (E♭ major), MWV U 180
2. Allegro leggiero (F♯ minor), MWV U 145
3. Andante tranquillo (B♭ major), MWV U 102
4. Presto: Spinnerlied ("Spinner's Song") (C major), MWV U 182
5. Moderato (B minor), MWV U 184
6. Allegro non troppo (E major), MWV U 188

The Spinnerlied has also been given the nickname the "Bee's Wedding" since the busy accompaniment to the melody resembles the buzzing of bees.

Book 6 was dedicated to Sophie Rosen.

==== Book 7, Op. Posth. 85 (1843–45) ====
1. Andante espressivo (F major), MWV U 150
2. Allegro agitato (A minor), MWV U 101
3. Presto (E♭ major), MWV U 111
4. Andante sostenuto (D major), MWV U 190
5. Allegretto (A major), MWV U 191
6. Allegretto con moto (B♭ major), MWV U 155

==== Book 8, Op. Posth. 102 (1842–45) ====
Op. Posth. 102, No. 4, Un poco agitato, ma andante, MWV U 152
Performed by FAE Piano cafe

Op. Posth. 102, No. 5, Allegro vivace, MWV U 194
Performed by Kostas Papastergiou

1. Andante un poco agitato (E minor), MWV U 162
2. Adagio (D major), MWV U 192
3. Presto (C major), MWV U 195
4. Un poco agitato, ma andante (G minor), MWV U 152
5. Allegro vivace (A major), MWV U 194
6. Andante (C major), MWV U 172

Books 7 and 8 were published posthumously.

=== Related works ===
A piece in D major for cello and piano, written by Mendelssohn around 1845 for cellist Lisa Cristiani, was published for the first time after his death. It was designated Opus 109 and entitled Song Without Words. It is not related to any of the piano pieces. Cellist Carlos Prieto called the piece "an exquisite composition, worthy of the finest pieces Mendelssohn ever composed for this genre."

A piece for piano in E minor by Mendelssohn was published after his death under Op. 117, entitled Albumblatt ("Album Leaf"); a further piece for piano by Mendelssohn was published after his death, without opus number, listed as WoO 10, titled Gondellied ("Gondola Song"). Some historians believe these to have been intended for another set of Songs Without Words.

== Arrangements ==
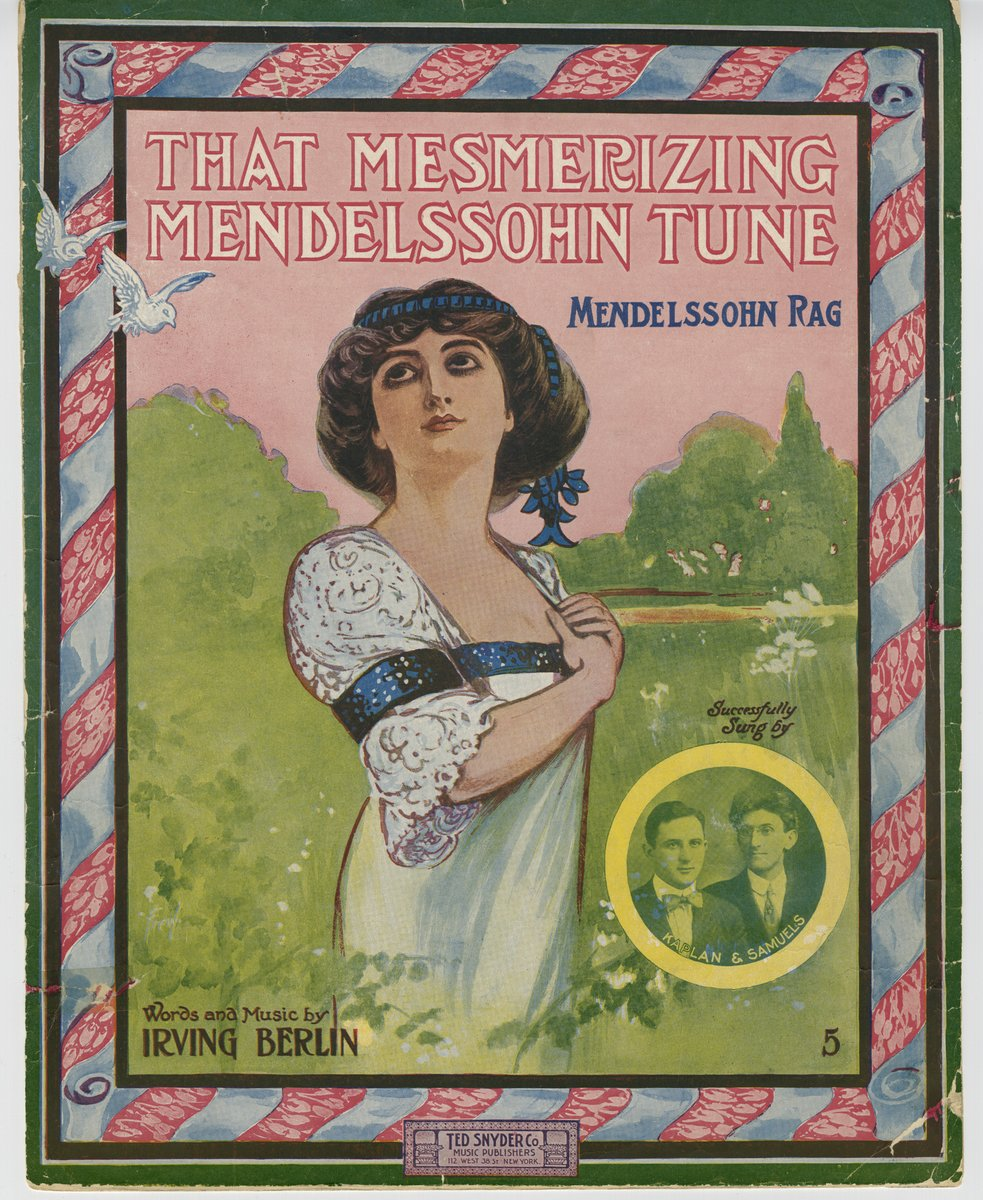
Irving Berlin's ragtime take on Op. 62, No. 6

Book 5, Op. 62, No. 6, Allegretto grazioso (Spring Song) (accordion orchestra arrangement)
Performed by Paul De Bra

Mendelssohn made piano duet arrangements of a number of the songs, namely those that became Book 5 and the first song of Book 6, which he presented to Queen Victoria in 1844. Mendelssohn was also aware of arrangements of some of the earlier Lieder for piano duet by Carl Czerny. Many others have made various arrangements of individual songs, including for orchestra, chamber ensemble, or solo instrument with piano accompaniment. One such example is the arrangement of 22 of the songs by Mendelssohn's student, the German violist Friedrich Hermann (1828–1907), for violin and piano.

In 1834, Franz Liszt wrote his Grosses Konzertstück über Mendelssohns Lieder ohne Worte (Grand Concert Piece on Mendelssohn's Songs Without Words) for 2 pianos. This was based on songs 1–3 of Book I, Op. 19b. Liszt and a student, Mlle. Vial, started to play it in Paris on 9 April 1835 but Liszt became ill during the performance. Ferruccio Busoni planned to play it in London with Egon Petri, but died before the plan could be realised. It was finally first performed in full by Richard and John Contiguglia at the 1984 Holland Liszt Festival in Utrecht.

There are also examples of recordings of transcriptions, for solo instrument and piano accompaniment, of Mendelssohn lieder written for the voice, which have been entitled "Songs Without Words", for instance by Mischa Maisky. No such arrangements were however made, or so titled, by Mendelssohn himself.

== By other composers ==
Fanny Mendelssohn's early collections of piano works opp. 2,6, and 8 are titled Lieder für das Pianoforte (Songs for the piano).

Other composers who were inspired to produce similar sets of pieces of their own included Charles-Valentin Alkan (the five sets of Chants, each ending with a barcarolle), Anton Rubinstein, Ignaz Moscheles and Edvard Grieg (his 66 Lyric Pieces). Two Songs Without Words (Op. 10) for piano were also written by Mykola Lysenko.

Both Alkan and Rubinstein frequently included items from Mendelssohn's Songs in their recitals. Ferruccio Busoni, who considered Mendelssohn "a master of undisputed greatness", turned to the Songs Without Words in the last year of his life for a projected series of recitals in London.
