= Salvador Viniegra =

Spanish painter

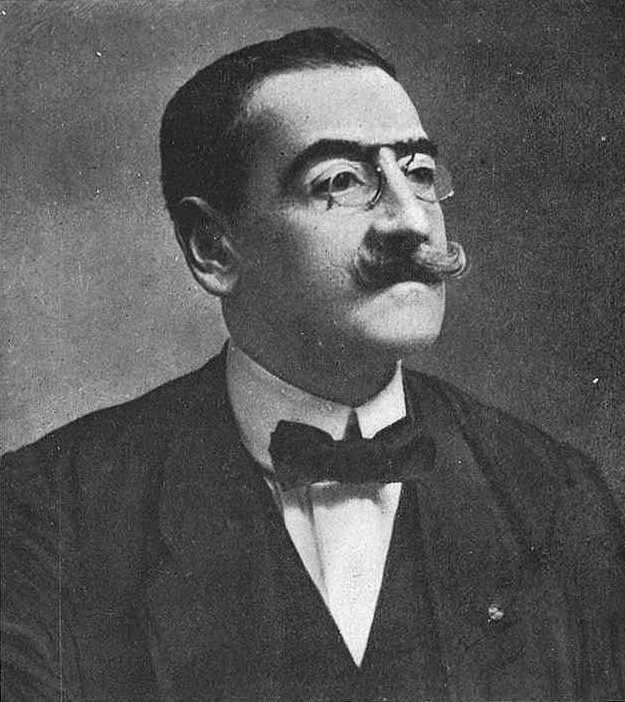
- Salvador Viniegra
- Born: November 23, 1862; Cádiz, Spain
- Died: April 29, 1915 (aged 52); Madrid, Spain
- Education: School of Fine Arts, Cádiz
- Known for: Painter; Deputy Director, Prado Museum
- Movement: Orientalist

Salvador Viniegra y Lasso de la Vega (November 23, 1862 – April 29, 1915) was a Spanish painter who specialised in history painting.

== Biography ==
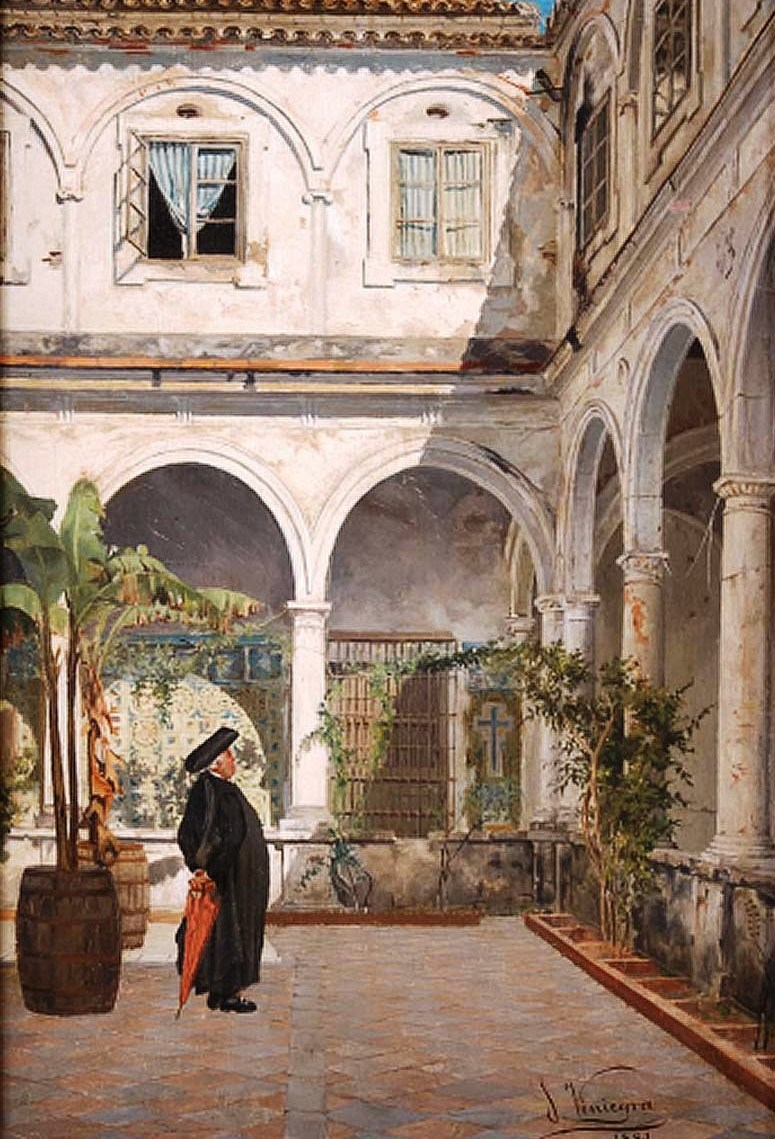
Patio del Convento de San Francisco de Cádiz, an 1881 work

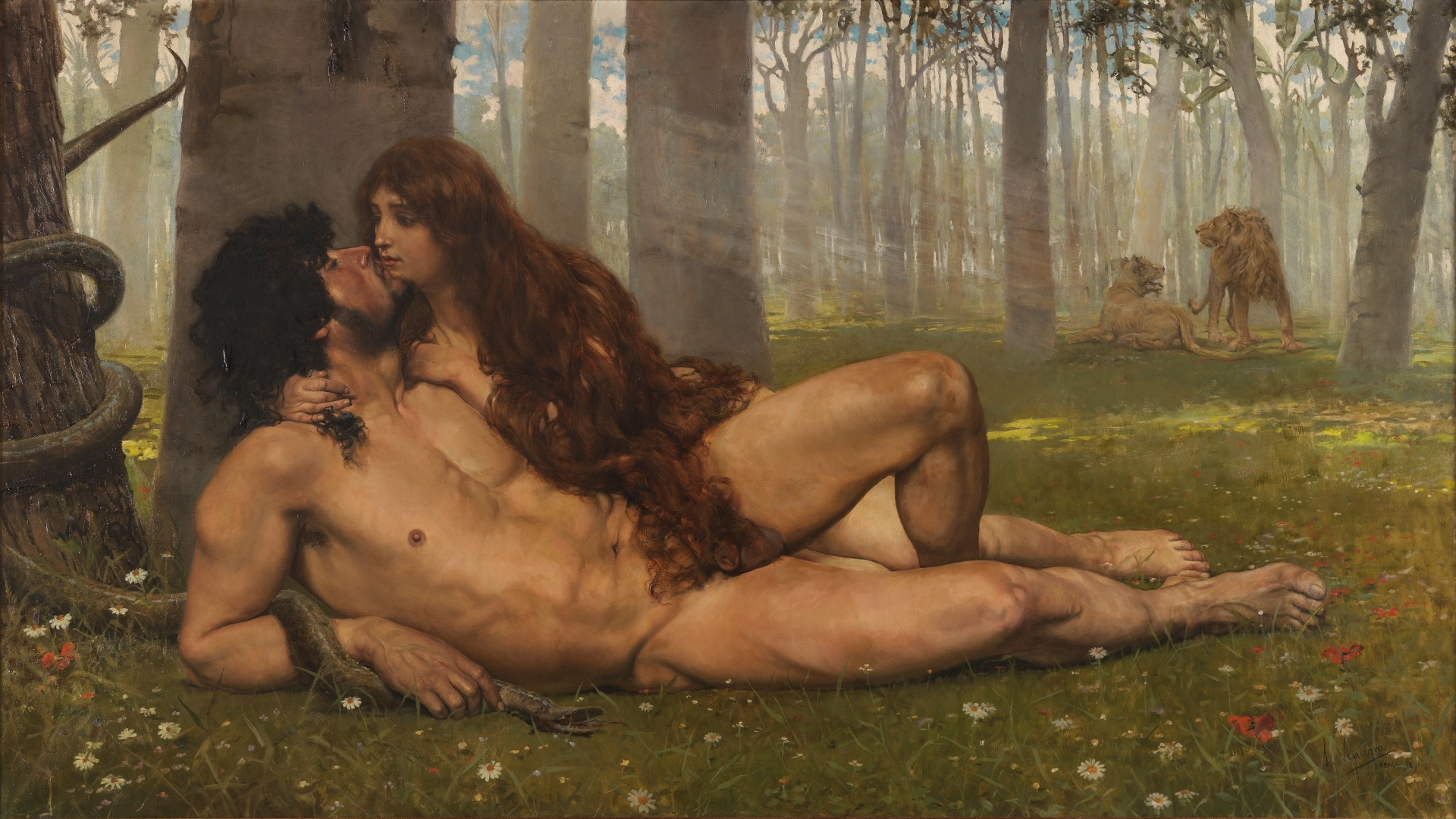
El primer beso ('the first kiss'; 1891; Museo del Prado)

Born in Cádiz, Viniegra began studying law but soon decided to be a painter and entered the School of Fine Arts, Cádiz, where he was taught by Rámon Rodríguez Barcaza and José Pérez Jiménez. He concentrated initially on painting watercolors, and a series of works in that genre, which grew eventually into an album, earned him his first taste of public success, in 1877. In the following years, he won various painting prizes at regional exhibitions and traveled to Rome, where he devoted himself to the study of life drawing.

Returning to Spain in 1882, he competed that same year in the Exposición de Hernandéz, submitting the painting Un patio de Sevilla as his entry. Later, another work of large proportions, La bendición de los campos en 1800, was exhibited at the Exposición Nacional de Madrid in 1887 and received the first prize in its category.

In 1890, he won a merit scholarship to study at the Academia Española de Bellas Artes in Rome where he resided until November 1896, and this Italian period marked the richest in his vast oeuvre. Displayed in Munich, Rome, and Budapest, his works were reproduced ceaselessly, making him one of the most popular painters in Europe. In 1897, La romería del Rocío was exhibited at the Sala Dante de Roma and at the Exposición Nacional de Bellas Artes de Madrid. It also appeared at the World's Fairs in 1898 in Munich and Vienna, where it won several gold medals. The painting continued its international tour when a Polish dealer agreed to exhibit it in various cities in Eastern Europe. Viniegra finally donated it to the Museum of Modern Art in Madrid in 1905.

Settling in Madrid, Viniegra was named the deputy director and conservator of the city's Museo del Prado in 1898. During this time, he became an important patron of the arts. Being a notable cellist himself, he gave particular support to musicians, among his beneficiaries being the composer Manuel de Falla and the cellist and conductor Juan Ruiz Casaux. He died in Madrid.
