= Jacques Gregoir =

Belgian pianist and composer

- Born: 19 January 1817; Antwerp, United Kingdom of the Netherlands
- Died: 29 October 1876 (aged 59) Ixelles, Belgium
- Genres: Classical
- Occupations: Pianist, composer
- Instrument: Piano

Joseph (Jacques) Grégoir (Gregoir) (19 Jan 1817 – 29 October 1876) was a Belgian pianist and composer.

== Biography ==
Already at a very young age showed an exceptional talent for music: he was barely 8 when he performed in public a piano concerto of Dussek, and quite successfully so to boot. His first music lessons were taught to him by his father, a very good amateur musician; subsequently he also took organ lessons from the Campine organist Valeriaan Homans. As a young boy he was sent to Paris by his family to follow piano classes with Henri Herz, most sources situating these lessons in the period after the Belgian revolution of 1830, one 19th-century source mentioning 'at age eleven'. A serious illness forced him to return to his family in Belgium six months later. In 1835 he left for Germany with his younger brother Edouard, with a view to completing his musical education. There he was trained by the famous pianist Christian Rummel in Bieberich. After two years he returned to Antwerp, where he gave some successful concerts.

While his career as a soloist and piano teacher took its course, Grégoir also actively applied himself to composing. A Lauda Sion for choir and orchestra performed in Antwerp was followed in 1847 by Faust, a large symphonic poem. One year later his opera Le Gondolier de Venise (3 acts) premiered in the royal theatre of Antwerp, to an enthusiastic public acclaim. In this period he conducted the orchestra of that theatre himself, as well as directing a German choral society. In 1848 he left his native town and relocated to Brussels. In 1849 he became music teacher in the English Boarding School in Bruges. In 1850 he married an Englishwoman, moving to Brussels again, where he was active as a piano teacher. Concurrently he undertook several concert journeys abroad as a piano virtuoso and composer for his instrument. He especially reaped a great success during a tour in Germany with the famous cellist Servais. Pougin called him "un-artiste extrêmement distingué, aussi excellent professeur qu’habile exécutant".

Grégoir's necrology in the Dutch periodical Caecilia mentions that he didn't get a position at the Brussels Conservatory but that in 1874 he was indeed appointed to ‘Professeur d’accompagnement’ of the ‘Institut musical’ founded in Brussels by the Dutch king William III. In some more modern biographies this gives cause to confusion with the Conservatory of Brussels, founded in 1827 during the Dutch regime. In that same year 1874 Grégoir was invested by the Dutch king with the Order of the Oak Crown.

In addition to the above-mentioned orchestral works Grégoir also composed over a hundred piano pieces, including etudes as well as virtuoso concert works, various fantasies and mélanges sur des airs d’opéras. In collaboration with Vieuxtemps and Léonard he composed some 50 works for violin and piano, in collaboration with Servais 25 duets for cello and piano. His École moderne du piano was used at Conservatories such as those of Brussels and Paris. He also developed a device for conveying more flexibility to the fingers: ‘le Clavier-déliateur’, a mute keyboard of 25 keys with variable resistance. It was displayed at the World Exhibition in Paris of 1867

== Works ==
- Written in collaboration with Adrien-François Servais & Jacques Gregoir (for cello & piano)
1. Duo brillant sur un Thème de Donizetti
2. Duo brillant sur des motifs de l’opéra Fra Diavolo
3. Duo brillant sur des motifs de l’opéra Le Prophète
4. Duo brillant sur des motifs de l’opéra Norma
5. Duo brillant sur des motifs de l’opéra Le Juif errant
6. Duo brillant sur des motifs de l’opéra L’Etoile du Nord
7. Duo brillant sur des motifs de l’opéra Martha
8. Grand Duo brillant sur des motifs de l’opéra Il Trovatore
9. Grand Duo sur des motifs de l’opéra Le Pardon de Ploërmel
10. Duo brillant sur des motifs de l’opéra Tannhaüser
11. Duo brillant sur des motifs de l’opéra Der Freischütz (Robin des bois)
12. Duo brillant sur des motifs de l’opéra Obéron
13. Grand Duo brillant sur des motifs de l’opéra Lohengrin
14. Duo brillant sur des motifs de l’opéra Don Juan
15. Duo brillant sur des motifs de l’opéra Euryanthe
16. Duo sur des motifs de l’opéra L’Africaine
17. Duo sur des airs espagnols
18. Duo brillant sur des motifs de l’opéra Preciosa
19. Duo sur des motifs de l’opéra Les Huguenots
20. Duo sur des motifs de l’opéra Les Puritains
21. Duo sur des motifs de l’opéra La Traviata
22. Duo sur des motifs de l’opéra Luisa Miller
23. Duo sur des motifs de l’opéra Rienzi
24. Duo sur des motifs de l’opéra Der fliegende Holländer (Le vaisseau fantôme)
25. Duo sur des motifs de l’opéra Aïda [Gregoir & Joseph Servais?]
26. Thèmes bohémiens
27. Thèmes russes
28. Duo sur des motifs de l’opéra La Somnambule
29. Duo sur des motifs de l’opéra Faust de Gounod [Gregoir & Joseph Servais]
- La Muette de Portici, opéra d’Auber / Muette (Masaniello). Duo
- Grand duo pour piano et violoncelle sur des motifs de l'opera Casilda
- Un Ballo in Maschera. Opera de Verdi. Duo pour Piano et Violoncelle
