= Sociedad de Cuartetos =

Organization providing concert series

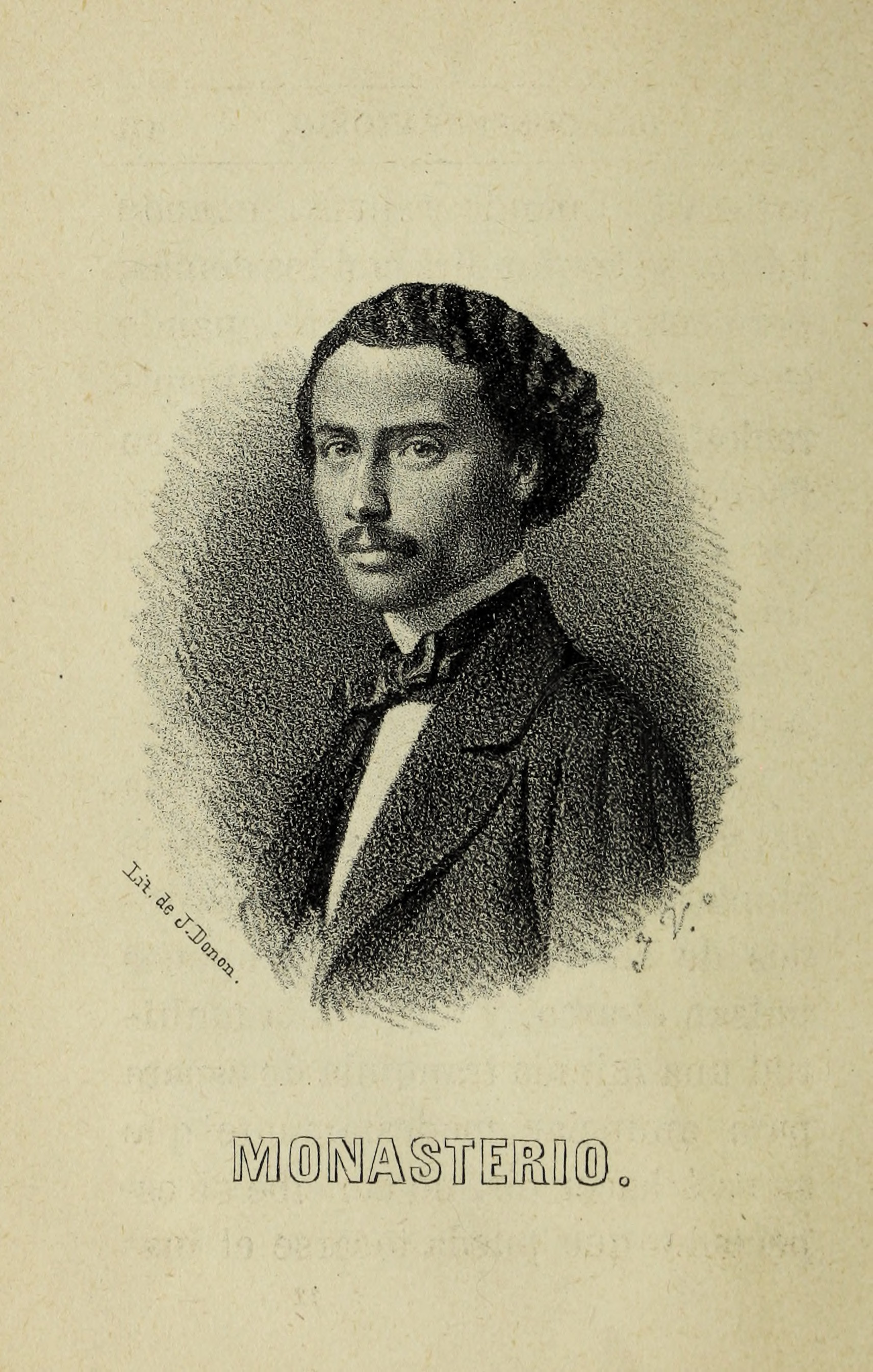
Jesús de Monasterio. Illustration in José de Castro y Serrano's Los Cuartetos Del Conservatorio. Published in 1866, Madrid.

The Sociedad de Cuartetos de Madrid (Madrid Quartet Society), 1863–1894, was an organization that provided concert series with an educational approach. They attempted to save chamber music from fading into oblivion since Italian opera and Zarzuela dominated Spanish concert life. Founded by violinist Jesús de Monasterio and pianist Juan María Guelbenzu Fernández in 1863, this society contributed significantly to the circulation and interest of chamber music in the Iberian Peninsula.

The quality of the music, over their thirty-one seasons, was always praised. They also exposed a lack of interest by the majority of the Spanish composers for the chamber music genre during this time.

Despite their great perseverance and increasing success, the society's activities concluded on January 5, 1894, due to health problems that troubled Monasterio for several seasons prior. The Society of Quartets represents the first serious and lasting initiative for the circulation of chamber music in 19th-century Spain. Their activities carried out through thirty-one concert seasons ( or "sessions" as defined them) in Madrid as well as other concerts offered outside the capital.

== History of the Institution. ==
The idea for this chamber music institution came from Monasterio, who had been a successful pupil of Charles de Bériot at the Royal Conservatory of Brussels. His distinguished career included the post of honorary violinist of the Capilla Real and the appointment as a professor of the Madrid Conservatory. After a successful European tour that included performances of string quartets of Beethoven and Schubert, Monasterio decided to return to his home country to initiate a quartet society in Madrid. Monasterio initially conceived this organization exclusively for strings, but his former tutor Basilio Montoya convinced him to collaborate with the Spanish pianist Guelbenzu. After his studies in Paris, Guelbenzu became a respected pianist who had befriended Chopin, Liszt, Giacomo Meyerbeer, and Sigismund Thalberg. The inclusion of Guelbenzu to this organization expanded their repertoire possibilities to include solo and chamber works for piano.

The long history of society can be distinguish in two periods:

- First period (1863–84): The society offers its concert seasons in a rehearsal room of the Madrid Conservatory. The society was officially formed by Jesús de Monasterio (first violin), Rafael Pérez (second violin), Tomás Lestán (violist), Ramón Rodriguez Castellanos (cellist), Juan María Guelbenzu (pianist) and Basilio Montoya (treasurer). During this period, the concerts were offered on Sundays at 2:00 pm every 15 days or weekly (since 1866).
- Second period (1884–94): The concert seasons took place in the "Salon Romero" in Madrid. After the death of Guelbenzu (pianist) and Basilio Montoya (treasurer), on October 18, 1884; the society wrote new statutes to their establishment. Those were the formal distinction the original String Quartet (Monasterio, Pérez, Lestán and Castellanos) and the new conditions for contracts of external musicians and the new rates for the public. The society also programmed a concert without piano music in which a crown of flowers was placed in a grand piano as tribute to Guelbenzu's career. At this point, concerts were offered on Fridays from 9:00 pm to 11:00 pm weekly.

== Members of the society and collaborations ==
The founding string quartet consisted of members of the Teatro Real, principal violist Tomás Lestán and the concertmaster Rafael Pérez as second violin. The cellist was Ramón Rodríguez Castellano, who was later replaced by the Franco-Polish cellist Víctor Mirecki. Other performers included pianists Mariano Vázquez Gómez (1863) Adolfo de Quesada (1868), the violist and composer Miguel Carreras (1869), clarinetist Antonio Romero (1875), cellist Agustín Rubio (1881), violinist Enrique Arbós (1882), and several collaborations with faculty from the Conservatory.

== Repertoire & Concert Series "Sesiónes" ==
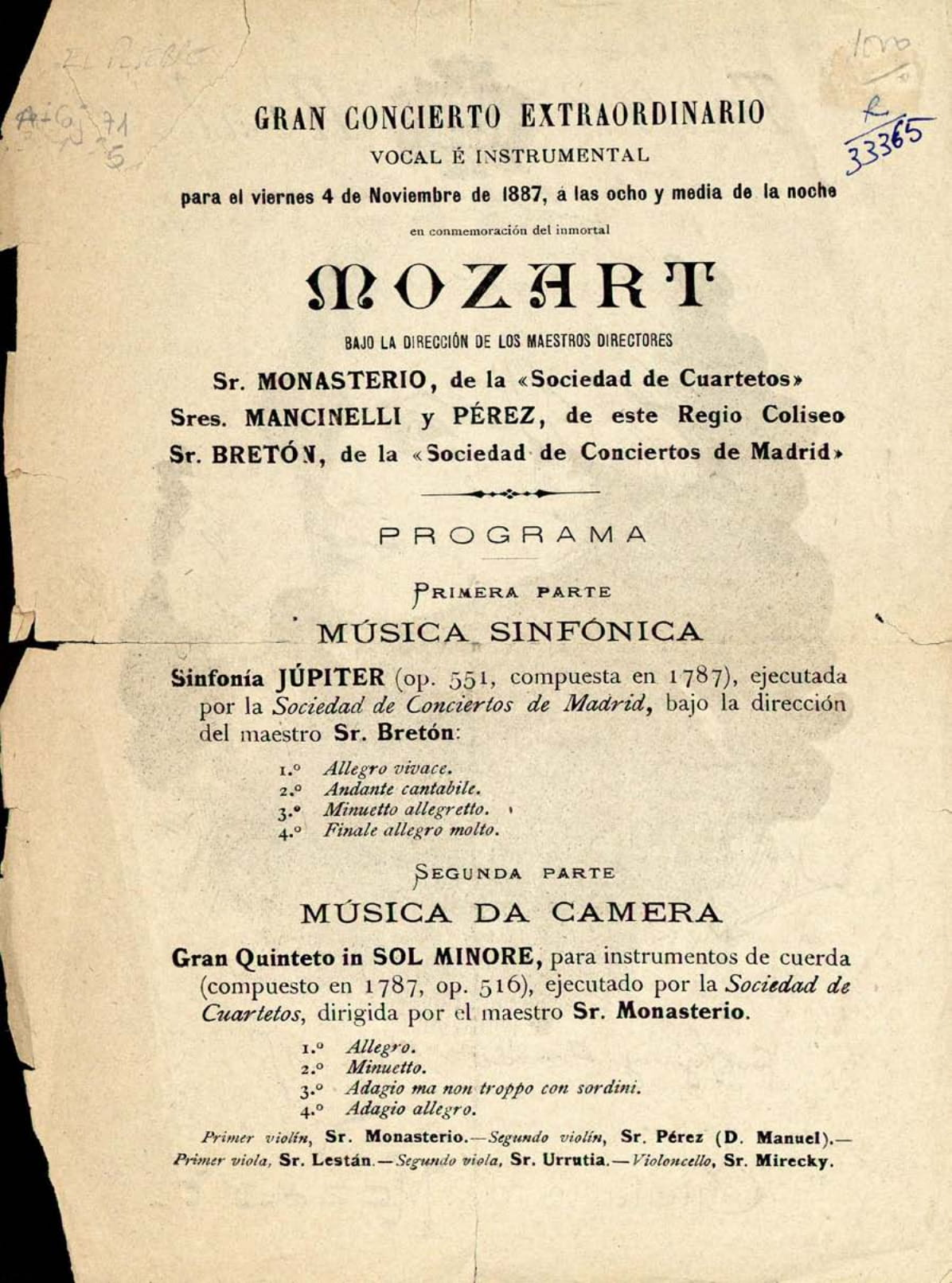
Mozart centenary concert program. Society performed Mozart K. 516

The concert seasons (referred to as sessions) occurred between November and March. Some extraordinary series of concerts were also offered in April. In their first year, there were only four sessions. From the second year onward, an average of 6 sessions was offered per season. This figure was considered insufficient by critics and the public, which is the reason the company decided to provide extraordinary sessions.

=== Sessions (Main concert Series) ===
This chamber music society performed a varied repertoire of 173 works by 33 different composers. In their first five seasons, however, programs mainly consisted of works by Beethoven, Mendelssohn, Mozart, and Haydn with an interesting inclusion of the String Quartet Op.74 No.1 by Louis Spohr in season two. This choice of repertoire reflects their educational mission to expose the German models on the chamber music genre, specifically those of First Viennese School. The evolution in variety of composers also encourages the inclusion of Spanish composers. In their sixth season, they dedicated a concert to works by Spanish composers, including M. Adalid, R. Pérez, M. Allú. Additionally, two works by the Cuban composer N. Ruiz Espadero were performed in the following season. Through the 1870s their repertoire added works by Onslow, Anton Rubinstein, Joseph Mayseder, G. Verdi, Joachim Raff, and even Giuseppe Tartini. The decade of the 1880s completely renewed their repertoire. Their programs included works that were new to audiences in Madrid, such as Schumann's String Quartets Op. 41, Schubert's String Quartet D.810 "Death and the Maiden", Grieg's Violin Sonatas Op. 8, Chopin Op. 3, Dvorak's Piano Quintet Op. 18, Scarlatti L. 390, Svendsen Op. 26. More obscure composers included Arriaga, Godard, Delsart, Nawrátil, and Monasterio himself. Their concert series concluded with a performance of Tchaikovsky's String Quartet No.1, Op.11, which was applauded with utmost respect and admiration.

The most important source for their repertoire are the concert programs located in the archives of the library of the Royal Superior Conservatory of Music of Madrid. They include the date of the season, the time, the season number corresponding to that season, the type of concert, the venue, and sometimes the catalog of the works. However, it is known that they also performed concerts in addition to their concert seasons, performing in different cities such as Valladolid, Burgos, Bilbao, Barcelona, Zaragoza, Asturias, and even outside of Spain. Each concert usually consisted of three works. From the news papers and musical press it is known that advertising circulated in Madrid days before the start of the concert season.

=== Repertoire by Concert Program ===
The following table contains information of the works presented by the society. Most of the society's concerts introduced introduce new works to their repertoire, but previous works were often repeated. The following information reflects only the first performance of each work, and these are not reflecting the entirety of the program presented on each of the concert seasons.

1st Concert Season	2nd Concert Season	3rd Concert Season	4th Concert Season	5th Concert Season	6th Concert Season	7th Concert Season
_{February 1, 1863}: Beethoven: Quartet in D, Op. 18; Beethoven: Sonata in F, Op. 24; Haydn: Quartet in G, Op 77; _{February 8, 1863}: Haydn: Quartet in C, op 76; Mozart: Sonata in F, K.376; _{February 22, 1863}: Beethoven: Trio in C, minor op 1; Mendelssohn: Quartet in D, op 44	_{November 15, 1863}: Beethoven: Quartet in F, Op. 18; Haydn: Quartet in D minor, Op. 76; Mozart: Quartet in G minor, K. 478; _{November 29, 1863}: Beethoven Sonata in E♭, Op. 12; Mozart: Quintet in G minor, K. 516; Spohr: Quartet in A minor, Op. 74; _{January 10, 1864}: Beethoven: Sonata in A minor, Op. 47; _{January 24, 1864}: Beethoven: Quartet in D, (arr. Piano Sonata) Op. 28; Mozart: Sonata in A, K. 526	_{November 20, 1864}: Haydn: Quartet in A, Op. 55; Mozart: Sonata in B♭, K.454; _{December 4, 1864}: Mendelssohn: Quartet in E♭, Op. 12; _{December 18, 1864}: Beethoven: Septet in E♭, Op. 20; _{January 8, 1865}: Mozart: Quartet in D minor, K. 421; _{January 22, 1865}: Haydn: Sonata in G, HXI 73	_{January 28, 1866}: Beethoven: Sonata in C, minor Op. 30; _{February 4, 1866}: Beethoven: Quartet in E minor, Op 59; _{February 18, 1866}: Beethoven: Sonata in C minor, Op. 10; Mozart: Quintet in C minor, K.406; _{March 4, 1866}: Haydn: Quartet in D, Op. 64; _{March 11, 1866}: Beethoven: Sonata in C minor, Op. 13	_{November 25, 1866}: Beethoven: Sonata in A♭, Op. 26; Haydn: Quartet in F, Op. 77; _{December 2, 1866}: Beethoven: Trio in C minor, Op. 9; _{December 16, 1866}: Mendelssohn: Trio in D minor, Op. 49; _{January 27, 1867}: Mozart: Quartet in B♭, K. 458; _{February 3, 1867}: Beethoven: Romance in F, Op. 50; Mendelssohn: Caprice in A minor, Op. 33; _{April 13, 1867}: Haydn: The Seven Last Words of Christ	_{November 17, 1867}: Haydn: Quartet in G, Op. 76; Mendelssohn: Quartet in E, Op. 44; _{December 15, 1867}: Mozart: Quartet in D, K.499; Beethoven: Sonata in C♯ minor, Op. 27; _{February 16, 1867}: M. Adalid: Sonata in the G; R. Pérez: Quartet in E♭; M. Sánchez Allú: Sonata in D	_{December 6, 1868}: Beethoven: Sonata in A, Op. 2; Haydn: Quartet in G minor, Op. 74; _{December 27, 1868}: Mozart: Quartet in D, K. 575; Espadero: Melody in B♭, "La caída de las hojas"; Espadero: Sonata in E♭; _{January 10, 1869}: Weber: Sonata in D minor, Op. 49; _{January 24, 1869}: Mendelssohn: Sonata in B♭, Op. 45; _{January 31, 1869}: Beethoven: Sonata in B♭, Op. 22
8th Concert Season	9th Concert Season	10th Concert Season	11th Concert Season	12th Concert Season	13th Concert Season	14th Concert Season
_{January 2, 1870}: Haydn: Quartet in G, Op. 64; _{January 9, 1870}: Beethoven: Sonata in E♭, Op. 7; _{January 30, 1870}: Mozart: Quintet in D, K.596; _{February 30, 1870}: Beethoven Quartet in A, Op 18	_{December 11, 1870}: Haydn: Quartet in B♭, Op. 76; Mendelssohn: Romance without words in E, Op. 19; _{December 18, 1870}: Onslow: Quartet in B♭, Op. 21; _{January 8, 1871}: Beethoven: Quartet in E♭, Op. 74; _{January 29, 1871}: Mozart: Sonata in F, K.497	_{January 7, 1872}: Mendelssohn: Quartet in F minor, Op. 2; _{January 14, 1872}: Beethoven: Quartet in B♭, Op. 18; _{January 21, 1872}: Schumann: Quintet in E♭, Op. 44; _{March 30, 1872}: Guelbenzu: Two Piano Compositions	_{December 1, 1872}: Haydn: Quartet in D, Op. 50; _{December 8, 1872}: Mendelssohn: Quartet in E, Op 81; _{December 15, 1872}: Beethoven: Quartet in C minor, Op. 18	_{January 18, 1874}: Beethoven: Quartet in E♭, (arr. Quintet) Op. 16; _{February 8, 1874}: Beethoven: Sonata in F minor, Op. 57; Mendelssohn: Violin Concerto in E minor, Op. 64	_{November 5, 1874}: Haydn: Quartet in C Op. 74; _{November 29, 1874}: Beethoven: Quartet in G, Op. 18; Mozart: Sonata in C minor, K. 457; _{January 3, 1875}: Mozart: Fantasia in C minor, K. 475; Rubinstein: Sonata in A minor, Op. 19; _{January 10, 1875}: Mozart: Quintet in A, K. 581	_{November 5, 1875}: Mendelssohn: Quartet in B minor, Op. 3; _{November 12, 1875}: Rubinstein: Trio in F, Op. 15; _{January 2, 1876}: Beethoven: Trio in E♭, Op. 1; Mendelssohn Quintet in B♭, Op. 87; _{February 13, 1876}: Beethoven: Serenade in D, Op. 8
15th Concert Season	16th Concert Season	17th Concert Season	18th Concert Season	19th Concert Season	20th Concert Season	21st Concert Season
_{November 31, 1876}: Verdi: Quartet in E minor Op. 31	_{November 4, 1877}: Mayseder: Trio in A♭, Op. 32; _{November 11, 1877}: Mozart: Quartet in F, K. 590; _{December 2, 1877}: Mendelssohn: Sonata in D, Op. 58	_{November 10, 1878}: Beethoven: Trio in C minor, Op. 66; _{December 29, 1878}: Mendelssohn: Song without Words Op. 109; Mozart: Sonata in D, K.576; Tartini: Adagio from 8th Violin Sonata	_{December 7, 1879}: Mendelssohn: Trio in C minor, Op. 66; _{December 21, 1879}: Beethoven: Quartet in F, Op. 59; _{January 4, 1880}: J. Raff Trio in A minor, Op. 155	_{December 5, 1880}: Schumann: Quartet in A minor, Op. 41; _{December 26, 1880}: Mozart: Quartet in C minor, K.465; _{January 16, 1881}: Schubert: Quartet in D minor, post D.810	_{December 4, 1881}: Grieg: Sonata in F, Op. 8; _{December 18, 1881}: Beethoven: Quartet in C minor, Op. 59; _{January 8, 1882}: Schubert: Quintet in C, D. 956; _{January 22, 1882}: Chopin: Polonaise brillante Op. 3	_{December 3, 1882}: Schumann: Sonata in A minor, Op. 105; _{December 25, 1882}: Schumann: Quartet in E♭, Op. 47; _{May 23, 1883}: Monasterio: Sierra Morena
22nd Concert Season	23rd Concert Season	24th Concert Season	25th Concert Season	26th Concert Season	27th Concert Season	28th Concert Season
_{December 26, 1884}: Mozart: Sonata in E minor, K. 304; Mozart: Sonata in D, K. 306; Mendelssohn, Octet in E♭, Op. 20; _{January 2, 1885}: Schumann: Trio in F, Op. 80; _{January 16, 1885}: Mozart: Sonata in D, K. 448; _{January 23, 1885}: Arriaga: First Quartet in D minor; _{February 13, 1885}: J. Raff: Andante from Sonata Op. 183; Tartini: 3rd Sonata in D minor	_{January 22, 1886}: Beethoven: Trio in G, Op. 9; _{January 29, 1886}: Scarlatti: Sarabande in G minor, Minuet in G, Burlesque in G.; Scarlatti: Sonata in D; _{February 19, 1886}: Schumann: Quartet in F, Op. 41; _{February 26, 1886}: Rubinstein: Sonata in D, Op. 18	_{December 10, 1886}: Schubert: Trio in B♭ D. 898; _{December 17, 1876}: Raff: Quartet in D, Op. 192; _{December 31, 1876}: Svendsen: Octet in A, Op. 3; _{January 21, 1876}: Arriaga: Quartet in E♭; Schubert: Fantasie in C major, D. 760; _{January 28, 1876}: Brahms: Quartet in G minor; _{February 10, 1876}: Chopin: Nocturne in F♯; Chopin: Polonaise in A♭, Svendsen: Romance Op. 26	_{November 25, 1887}: Mendelssohn: Sonata in E, Op. 6; _{December 2, 1887}: Rubinstein: Sonata in F minor Op. 49; _{January 27, 1888}: Chopin: Sonata in B♭ minor, Op. 35	_{November 30, 1888}: Saint-Saëns: Quartet in B♭, Op. 41; _{December 28, 1888}: Schumann: Carnaval, Op. 9; Svendsen: Quintet in C, Op. 5; _{January 11, 1889}: Brentón: Trio in E; _{March 31, 1889}: Godard: Sonata in D minor, Op. 104; _{April 2, 1889}: Rubinstein: Melody Op. 3	_{October 25, 1889}: Dvorak: Quintet in A, Op. 81; _{November 8, 1889}: Brahms: Sextet in B♭, Op. 18; Chopin: Sonata in B♭, Op. 58; _{November 15, 1889}: Beethoven: Quintet in C, Op. 29; _{November 29, 1889}: Rubinstein: Trio in B♭, Op. 52; _{November 7, 1890}: Schubert: Quintet in A, D. 667	_{September 18, 1890}: Chopin: Polonaise in E♭; Delsart: Korrigane arr. for Cello & Piano; Monasterio: Adios a la Alhambra.; Monasterio: Rondo Liebanense; _{November 7, 1890}: Nawratil: Quintet in C minor, Op. 17; _{November 28, 1890}: Beethoven: Quartet in A minor, Op. 132; _{December 5, 1890} _{4th, 1880}: Asioli: Sonata in C
29th Concert Season		30th Concert Season		31st Concert Season		
_{November 6, 1891}: Schumann: Sonata in D minor, Op. 121; _{November 13, 1891}: Brahms: Trio in C minor, Op. 101; _{November 20, 1891}: Saint-Saëns: Sonata in C minor, Op. 32; _{November 27, 1891}: Beethoven: Sonata in C minor, Op. 111; Chopin: Nocturne in F; Raff: La Fileuse; Mozart: Sonata in D, K.1, No. 2 and No. 1; Mozart: Rondo in A minor, K. 511; _{December 4, 1891}: Rubinstein: Sonata in G, Op. 39, _{December 18, 1891}: Schumman: Elevation and L'Oiseau prophète from Op.82; Schumman: Sonata in G minor Op. 22,		_{November 18, 1892}: Saint-Saëns: Trio in F, Op. 18; _{December 2, 1892}; Weber: Sonata in E♭, Op. 47		_{December 4, 1893}: Godard: Quartet in A, Op. 136; _{December 8, 1893}: Beethoven: Trio in B♭, Op. 97; _{December 15, 1893}: Brahms: Quintet in B minor, Op. 115; _{December 22, 1893}: Grieg: Sonata in G minor, Op. 13; _{December 29, 1893}: Schumann/Wieck: Sonata No. 4 in F minor; _{January 5, 1894}: Tchaikovsky: Quartet in D, Op. 11		

=== Repertoire Selections ===
The repertoire selection show a clear preference for composers of Germanic countries. The most widespread compositions were those by: Beethoven (37 different works), Mozart (25), Haydn (14), Mendelssohn (18), Schumann (13), Rubinstein (8), Schubert (only 5). Schubert works appeared relatively late in their concert seasons (since 1889) and his works did not achieve great success or were regularly scheduled. The performers frequently repeated works in their programs as requested by the audience.

Mozart String Quintet No. 4 in G minor, K. 516 was the most interpreted work (33 times between 1863 and 1891), followed by Beethoven's Violin Sonata No. 9, Op. 47 (29 times), and Mozart's Quartet in D minor K. 421 (23 times).

=== Performance Venues ===
Rehearsal Hall at the Conservatory:

A small room at Madrid Conservatory served for their first performances. This room was intended for lectures at the conservatory. It was usually described as small, cold, sober, and poorly decorated. It had chairs and straw benches for the public, a small ticket box with four music stands, and a grand piano made by the Pleyel house. After the first concerts, the room became inadequate to accommodate the audience. Therefore, this room was renewed in 1879: The box disappeared, and a parquet floor is installed, which offered a broader space to the interpreters. However, these modifications were not to the liking of Monasterio, who constantly complained of excessive loudness and resonance issues.

Salón Romero:

Formerly a ballroom for meetings known as Café Teatro de Capellanes, Salon Romero Opened on April 30, 1884. It showed a luxurious decoration, capacity for 450 seated people (expandable to 700), a circular stage with capacity for 50 performers, and excellent acoustics. The capacity of the venue allowed society to reduce the price of tickets for certain sections of the audience, with the idea of attracting more public and make themselves more accessible to the lower class.

Performances Outside of Madrid:

- 1878: Monasterio proposed attempt to organize a concert in Paris followed by a tour of concerts in France and Belgium. it was not achieved due to financial concerns
- 1882: Three concerts are offered in Lisbon in April. For this, Rafael Perez was replaced by Arbós
- 1886: A single concert is offered in Lisbon.
- 1889: They offered three concerts in the Municipal Conservatory of Valencia in March and April.
- 1890: Tour through Valladolid, Burgos, Bilbao, Barcelona, and Zaragoza in February and March
- 1890: Tour in Asturias: Oviedo, Aviles and Gijón in September.
- 1890: Other four performances in Bilbao.

=== Ticket Prices and Profit ===
The ticket prices of the society were considered regular prices for his time. These were such to make them affordable for the most audience. The Spanish Peseta became the official currency after 1869, which equated approximately 4 reales.

First period (1863-1884):	Second period (1884-1894):
Season tickets: 60 reales; Individual tickets: 20 reales	Season tickets (first 6 concerts): 15–25 Pesetas; Second annual season (3 concerts): Half the price.; Individual tickets: 3–5 pesetas.

They divided earnings were among the members of society. For external musicians individual contracts were made including all pianists after Guelbenzu. The society had a pedagogical and informative mission, absolutely not lucrative. For this reason it was not an initiative with significant profit.

== Legacy ==
Society of Quartets of Madrid is remembered for their excellence of chamber music performance. From their very first season, they received notable reviews and their success inspired new musical societies and chamber music enthusiasm. The Society of Quartets is one of the best examples of exceptional patrimony from Iberian countries. Mariano Soriano Fuertes, described the impact of the society in his publication Calendario Histórico—Musical in 1873 as an example of how, though Germany produced some of the greatest chamber music works, Spain can be proud to be home of great performers of such masterpieces. Soriano Fuentes goes further to say that the benefits of the society can be seen in an apparent inspiration seen in the work of young composers since the year of 1864.

TRANSLATION: Germans can be proud of the works of their illustrious children Mozart, Beethoven and Haydn; However, the Spaniards can also be the distinguished interpreters of these works and that form the Society of Quartets. We have heard the instrumental music of the aforementioned classic authors, in Germany, Belgium, England and France, and although perfectly interpreted by distinguished professors, we have not heard it so perfectly felt, so masterfully accentuated and with such difficult ease felt, as in the Hall of the National School of Music. The benefits that the Society of Quartets has reported to art can be seen in the turn taken by young composers in their new works from the year 1864 to the present, and the taste that has developed among fans of this kind of music , so supporters before the cut and melodic rhythm of Italian music. The benefits of utility that have been reported by distinguished professors, creators, and supporters of such great thinking, compared to their work and efforts, are equal to zero. Things of Spain!

Los alemanes pueden estar orgullosos con las obras de sus ilustres hijos Mozart, Beethoven y Haydn; empero los españoles lo pueden estar también por los distinguidos intérpretes de dichas obras y que forman la Sociedad de Cuartetos. Hemos oído ejecutar la música instrumental de los antedichos clásicos autores, en Alemania, Bélgica, Inglaterra y Francia, y aunque perfectamente interpretada por profesores distinguidos, no la hemos oído tan perfectamente sentida, tan magistralmente acentuada y con tan dificil facilidad sentida, como en el salón de la Escuela nacional de música. Los beneficios que ha reportado al arte la Sociedad de Cuartetos, pueden verse en el giro que han tomado los jóvenes compositores en sus nuevas obras desde el ario 1864 hasta el presente, y el gusto que se ha desarrollado entre los aficionados a esta clase de música, tan partidarios antes del corte y ritmo melódico de la música italiana. Los Beneficios de la utilidad que han reportado los distinguidos profesores, creadores, y sostenedores de tan gran pensamiento, comparados con sus trabajos y desvelos, son iguales a cero. Cosas de España!

— Soriano Fuertes, Mariano. Calendario histórico musical para el año de 1873. Madrid: Impr. de la Biblioteca de instruccion y recreo, Page: 58. 1872.

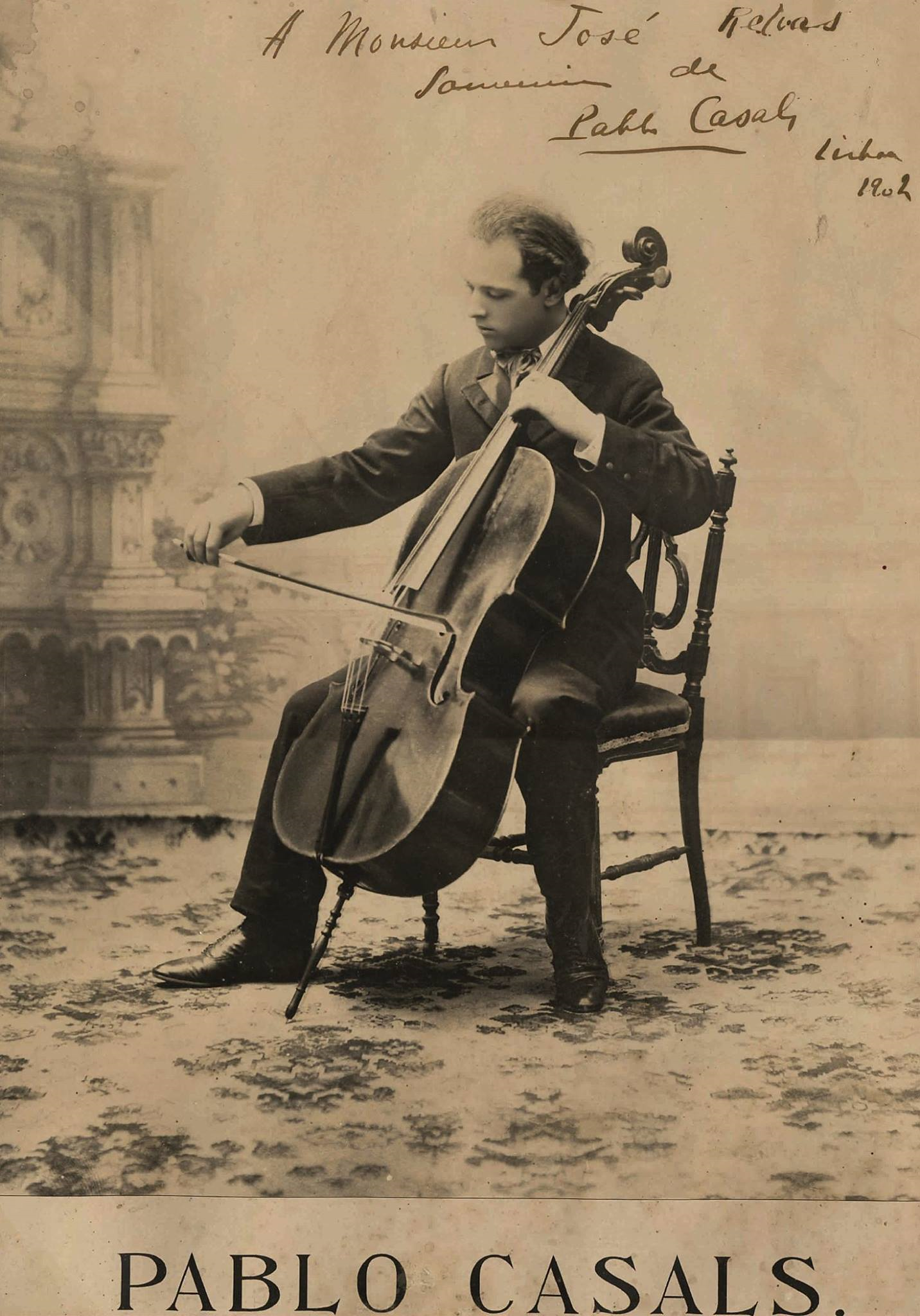
Pablo Casals was among the most distinguished students at the Madrid conservatory, who collaborated with Monasterio and the other members Society of Quartets.

Analysis of the interpretation and reception of chamber music in Spain during the 19th century has identified a transformation of the sensibility and critical aesthetic especially during the decade of 1870, which allowed the gradual assimilation of classic and romantic chamber music works. Thus, Spanish concert life began to equate that of rest of Europe. As described by José Castro y Serrano, Spain was admirably predisposed to the appreciation and assimilation of all fine arts. It was the special circumstances of a political and economic hardship that stopped fifty years of progress in the country's scientific, literary and artistic development. In this evolution, the Society of Quartets played a crucial pedagogical role. From the small recital hall in the conservatory and later at the Salon Romero, the members of the Society served as professors who taught with their performances the music of the great masters of chamber music. Their concerts also included the severe and delicate character of Spanish music. Their cultivation of chamber music was enjoyed by the proletarian and working classes.

Among his most outstanding students were cellist Pablo Casals and violinist Enrique Fernández Arbós. Casals lived in Madrid for two years where he studied counterpoint with Tomas Breton; and chamber music with Jesus de Monasterio. A that point, Monasterio was also the Director of the Madrid Conservatory. Breton was a leading Spain's composer, and had written the first genuinely Spanish opera. In his memoirs, Casals said Monasterio was an excellent teacher that emphasized intonation and proper accentuation in chamber music performance. Casals grew musically under the influence of both these fine musicians.

=== Audience Reception ===
In the first stage (1863-1884): More influx than allowed by the small conservatory room. On many occasions, a good part of the public remained standing. In the second stage (1884-1894): It does not get to fill the stalls of the Romero Hall. The concerts had a small but understandable audience, a minority compared to that of the opera and the zarzuela. The society received favorable reviews and had a progressively wider presence in local and national newspapers. According to the criticisms published, the high interpretative quality of all musicians, especially the violinist Jesús de Monasterio, can be confirmed. The violinist's interpretive style would be seen, from the current point of view, not entirely respectful of the historical criteria of interpretation or the wishes of the oldest authors. As described in texts by his Quartet colleagues, Monasterio often took artistic licenses, especially as regards the choice of tempos and the character and dynamics of certain musical phrases. On the other hand, he was very rigorous with the tuning and rhythmic coordination of the Quartet. It would not come, until the 1880s, a stream of musicians who sought a more faithful and less artificial interpretation of the classical authors. The new current was represented by Arbós (upon his return from Germany) who made more than one criticism of his teacher
