= José Luis de Mirecki Ruiz-Casaux =

Spanish economist

José Luis de Mirecki Ruiz-Casaux (September 2, 1922 – September 2, 2000) was a Spanish economist.

He was a nephew of the famed cellist Juan Ruiz Casaux.
