= Maurice de Mirecki =

French pianist, violinist, and composer

Maurice de Mirecki (22 September 1845 – 11 April 1900) was a French pianist, violinist and composer.

== Biography ==
Born in Pau, Pyrénées-Atlantiques, Maurice Antoine Lucien de Mirecki, was the eldest son of Count Aleksander Mirecki who was also a renowned violinist, and of Marie Zeline Larramat. His father, a hero of the November Uprising of 1830–1831 against Russia, had taken refuge in France ruled by King Louis-Philippe, first in Paris during a brief stay, then settled in Tarbes, where he taught violin. The couple also had two other children, Victor and Françoise. The three children of the family all devoted themselves to music.

In 1865, Mirecki moved to Paris with his younger brother Victor de Mirecki, where he stayed all his life and led a very social life.

In 1869, he married Colette Adam, a young soprano, with whom he had three children:

- Caroline Jeanne Nicolette de Mirecki (16 March 1876 – 1947), married in 1900 to Eugène Ronsin, French painter and decorator
- Armand Victor de Mirecki
- Maurice Charles de Mirecki (born 11 November 1887).

Mirecki is known for his achievements as a soloist and composer.

He died in the 19th arrondissement of Paris at age 54.

== Works ==
- Fanfan et Colas (1892), opera, libretto by Louis Bouvet.

Among his compositions, several works were written for his wife:

- Polkas Chambertin pour soprano et piano (1876, with lyrics by G. de Loyat)
- Embrasse moi vite (1879)
- Souvenir de Roumanie (1875)
- works for piano (1880), which are a series of studies.
