= Adrien-François Servais =

Belgian cellist (1807–1866)

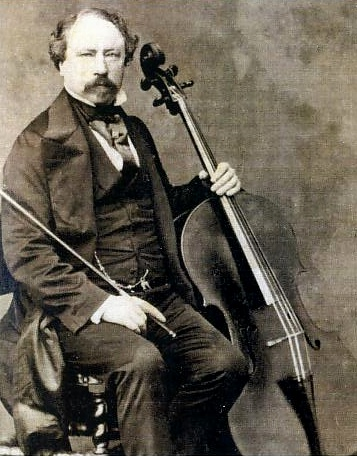

Background information
- Born: 6 June 1807; Halle, Dyle, French Empire
- Died: 26 November 1866 (aged 59) Halle, Belgium
- Genres: Classical
- Occupation(s): Cellist, composer
- Instrument: Violoncello

Adrien-François Servais (6 June 1807 – 26 November 1866) was one of the most influential cellists of the nineteenth century. He was born and died in what is now Halle, Belgium. He is one of the founders of the Modern Cellistic Schools of Paris and Madrid, which began through collaboration with his friend Auguste Franchomme and his disciple Víctor Mirecki Larramat. His compositions are still studied, performed and recorded all over the world. Two of his sons also had musical careers and performed his music.

== Biography ==
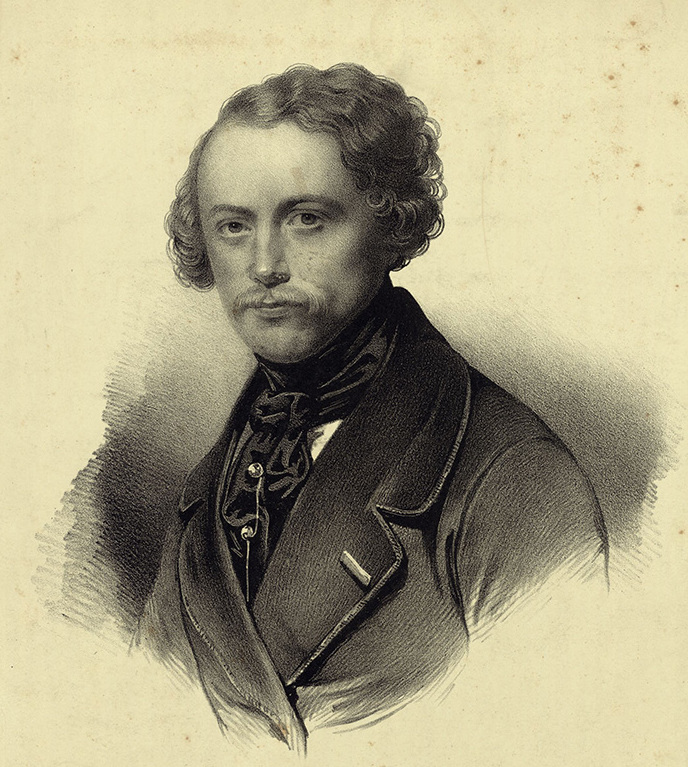
Portrait of Adrien-François Servais

Servais was originally trained as a violinist before switching to cello. Known by his contemporaries for his virtuosity and excessive vibrato, he was given the gift of a Stradivarius cello from 1701, which today bears his name. He is also known as the first cellist to adopt the bassists' use of an endpin because of the large size of his Stradivarius.

(The use of the endpin was, however, not generally adopted by most cellists until the early 20th century. For instance, Carlo Alfredo Piatti never used an endpin, though Lisa Cristiani's use of it in the 1840s and 1850s popularized the practice for female cellists.)

Servais composed numerous works for his instrument, including four concerti and nearly twenty duos for two cellos or for cello and violin. Hector Berlioz referred to Servais as "the Niccolò Paganini of the cello".

In addition, Servais worked with French cellist and friend Auguste Franchomme and Spanish cellist Víctor Mirecki Larramat to found the Modern Cellistic Schools of Paris and Madrid. They influenced the development of future noted cellists, such as Pablo Casals and others from Spain.

=== Family and legacy ===
Servais and his wife, reportedly one of two daughters of a Russian Jewish merchant Eliazar Litman Feigin, had several children, including two sons who also pursued musical careers.

Their daughter Zofia Servais married Cyprian Godebski, a Polish sculptor in the Russian Empire, who became a professor at the Imperial Institute of Arts in St. Petersburg. Zofia died in a nearby town shortly after the birth in March 1872 of daughter Maria Zofia Olga Zenajda Godebska, known as Misia. Godebski sent his daughter to Belgium to be cared for by her Servais family for several years. She was given early musical tranining and had precocious gifts. She became a pianist.

Later Godebski remarried and reclaimed his daughter; he enrolled her in a convent boarding school in Paris for eight years. Known best as Misia Sert, she was an important patron of Paris's early 20th century artistic community, which she encouraged through hosting numerous artists, writers and musicians at her salons.

Some years after his death in 1866, Servais was honored by his home town of Halle. His sculptor son-in-law, Professor Cyprian Godebski, created and installed a statue of him in front of the town hall on its central market square.

The South-West Brabant Museum in Halle has a collection on his life and work. It also holds material about his granddaughter Misia Sert and her father Cyprian Godebski.

== Works ==
- Own Compositions
  - Fantaisie sur un thème favori, Op. 1 for cello and piano - also for cello and harp
  - Souvenir de Spa, fantaisie, Op. 2 for cello and piano - also cello and quartet
  - Le Comte Ory. Caprice, Op. 3 for cello and piano - also for two cellos
  - Fantaisie et Variations brillantes sur la Valse de Schubert, Intitulée Le Désir, Op. 4 for cello and piano - also for cello and orchestra
  - Concerto (en Si mineur) Op. 5 for cello and piano - also for cello and orchestra
  - Le Barbier de Séville, Grande Fantaisie, Op. 6 for cello and piano - also for cello and quartet - also for cello and orchestra
  - Andante cantabile et Rondo à la Mazurka sur un Air de Balfe, Op. 7 for cello and piano - also for cello and orchestra
  - Fantaisie Characteristique sur deux célèbres Romances de Lafont, Op. 8 for cello and piano - also for cello and quartet - also for cello and orchestra
  - Fantaisie burlesque (ou le Carnaval de Venise), Op. 9 for cello and piano - also for cello and quartet - also for cello and orchestra
  - Souvenir de la Suisse. Caprice, Op. 10 for cello and piano - also for cello and quartet - also for cello and orchestra
  - 6 Caprices pour Violoncelle, Op. 11 for 2 cellos
  - Grande fantaisie sur des motifs de l’opera Lestocq, Op. 12 for cello and piano - also for cello and quartet - also for cello and orchestra
  - Fantaisie sur 2 Airs russes, Op. 13 for cello and piano - also for cello and quartet
  - Morceau de Concert (deuxieme Concerto en Mi mineur), Op. 14 for cello and piano - also for cello and quartet - also for cello and orchestra
  - Souvenir de St. Petersburg. Fantaisie, Op. 15 for cello and piano - also for cello and orchestra
  - La Fille du Régiment. Fantaisie et Variations, Op. 16 for cello and piano - also for cello and quartet - also for cello and orchestra
  - O cara memoria: Fantaisie et Variations, Op. 17 for cello and piano - also for cello and orchestra
  - Concerto Militaire (en Ut mineur), Op. 18 for cello and piano - also for cello and orchestra
  - Grande Fantaisie polonaise sur des Airs du ballet ‘La Noce de Cracovie’, Op. 19 for cello and piano - also for cello and orchestra
  - Souvenir de Bade. Grande Fantaisie, Op. 20 for cello and piano - also for cello and orchestra
  - Souvenir de Czernowitz. Morceau de Salon sur des Airs Roumains, Op. 21 for cello and piano
  - Concerto (en La mineur) Op. posthumous for cello and piano - also for cello and orchestra
- Servais & Joseph Ghys (cello & violin)
  - Variations brillantes et concertantes sur l’air “God Save the King”
- Servais & Henri Vieuxtemps (cello & violin)
  - Grand Duo sur des motifs de l’Opéra Les Huguenots de G. Meyerbeer
- Servais & Hubert Léonard (cello & violin)
  - Grand Duo de Concert sur deux airs nationaux anglais
  - 2me Grand duo de Concert sur des thèmes de Beethoven
  - 3me Duo de Concert
  - 4e Duo de Concert sur des motifs de l’opéra L’Africaine de Meyerbeer
- Servais & Jacques Gregoir (cello & piano)
1. Duo brillant sur un Thème de Donizetti
2. Duo brillant sur des motifs de l’opéra Fra Diavolo
3. Duo brillant sur des motifs de l’opéra Le Prophète
4. Duo brillant sur des motifs de l’opéra Norma
5. Duo brillant sur des motifs de l’opéra Le Juif errant
6. Duo brillant sur des motifs de l’opéra L’Etoile du Nord
7. Duo brillant sur des motifs de l’opéra Martha
8. Grand Duo brillant sur des motifs de l’opéra Il Trovatore
9. Grand Duo sur des motifs de l’opéra Le Pardon de Ploërmel
10. Duo brillant sur des motifs de l’opéra Tannhaüser
11. Duo brillant sur des motifs de l’opéra Der Freischütz (Robin des bois)
12. Duo brillant sur des motifs de l’opéra Obéron
13. Grand Duo brillant sur des motifs de l’opéra Lohengrin
14. Duo brillant sur des motifs de l’opéra Don Juan
15. Duo brillant sur des motifs de l’opéra Euryanthe
16. Duo sur des motifs de l’opéra L’Africaine
17. Duo sur des airs espagnols
18. Duo brillant sur des motifs de l’opéra Preciosa
19. Duo sur des motifs de l’opéra Les Huguenots
20. Duo sur des motifs de l’opéra Les Puritains
21. Duo sur des motifs de l’opéra La Traviata
22. Duo sur des motifs de l’opéra Luisa Miller
23. Duo sur des motifs de l’opéra Rienzi
24. Duo sur des motifs de l’opéra Der fliegende Holländer (Le vaisseau fantôme)
25. Duo sur des motifs de l’opéra Aïda [Gregoir & Joseph Servais?]
26. Thèmes bohémiens
27. Thèmes russes
28. Duo sur des motifs de l’opéra La Somnambule
29. Duo sur des motifs de l’opéra Faust de Gounod [Gregoir & Joseph Servais]
- La Muette de Portici, opéra d’Auber / Muette (Masaniello). Duo
- Grand duo pour piano et violoncelle sur des motifs de l'opera Casilda
- Un Ballo in Maschera. Opera de Verdi. Duo pour Piano et Violoncelle
- Transcriptions of works by other composers
  - Elégie en ut pour l'Alto, J. F. Mazas, op. 73
  - La Romanesca, fameux air de danse de la fin du XVIme siècle
  - Le Lac de Côme. Barcarolle composée par Mr. G. Alari
  - Souvenirs élégiaques de A. Bessems
  - Regrets, Pensée musicale à la mémoire de la Reine des Belges, par J. Grégoir
  - La Veillée, Pastorale de B. Damcke
  - Etudes de Rhythme par L. J. Meerts. Transcrites pour deux Violoncelles
  - 6 Morceaux caractéristiques composés par H. Ferd. Kufferath, Op. 30
  - 2 Mazurkas de Chopin [Mazurka in F sharp Minor Op. 6 No 1 en Mazurka in F Minor Op. 7 No 3]
  - Nocturne de F. Chopin [Nocturne in E flat Major Op. 9 No 2]
- Unpublished compositions
  - Fantaisie intitulée concertino
  - Fantaisie La Romantique
  - Souvenir d’Anvers
  - Fantasia sur la folle
  - Fantaisie élégante
  - Fantaisie et Variations n° 18
  - Fantaisie Caprice pour 2 Violoncelles
  - Fantaisie pour violoncelle
  - Maître Corbeau
  - Fantaisie sur l’hymne national/Fantaisie belge pour violoncelle
  - Air varié pour contrebasse
  - Deux célèbres mélodies de Glinka
  - Grand Duo de Guillaume Tell (Servais & Jules Godefroid)
  - Duo sur Lucie de Lammermoor (Servais & Félix Godefroid)
- Not yet located compositions
  - Le Chant des Alpes
  - Grande Fantaisie, Souvenir de Naples
  - Fantaisie slave
  - Caprice ‘Hommage à Rossini’
  - Souvenir de Haydn
  - Cinquième Concerto*
  - Souvenir de Kiev
  - Variations on the Russian Anthem theme
  - Souvenirs du Mont-d'Or
  - Larghetto - W. A. Mozart (arranged by Servais for cello, organ-harmonium and piano)
  - Melodie for voice and cello (Servais & Willem Pasques de Chavonnes Vrugt )
  - Grand Duo de piano et violoncelle (with Jules Déjazet)
- Note: The 4th Concerto, in A minor, Op. Posth. has been found and a performance of it is available on YouTube by cellist Seeli Toivio.

== Bibliography ==
- Lev Ginsburg, History of the Violoncello, Paganiniana Publications, 1983
- Peter François, Adrien François Servais (1807–1866), The Paganini of the Cello
- Peter François, Ah! Le métier de donneur de concerts! Adrien François Servais (1807–1866) als rondreizend cellovirtuoos, Halle, Servais Society, 2007 (ISBN 978-90-78897-01-9)
- Peter François, Adrien François Servais 1807-2007. Halse cellist met wereldfaam. Catalogus van de tentoonstelling in Halle, 5 mei - 6 juni 2007, Halle, Servais Society, 2007 (illustrated exhibition catalogue) (ISBN 978-90-78897-02-6)
