= Franciszek Mirecki =

Polish composer, music conductor, and music teacher

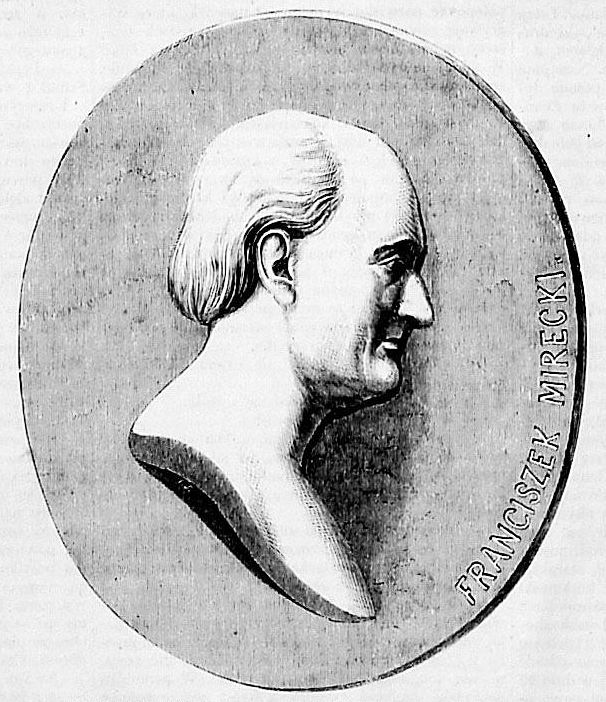
- Born: 31 March 1791; Kraków
- Died: 29 May 1862 (aged 71); Kraków
- Occupation(s): composer music conductor music teacher
- Children: Stanislaus Mirecki; Kasimir Mirecki

Franciszek (also spelled Franz) Wincenty Mirecki (1791–1862) was a Polish composer, music conductor, and music teacher.

Mirecki was born on 31 March 1791 in Kraków. His maternal grandfather was Dominik Goronczkiewicz, a known organist.

Mirecki played the piano at the age of four, and gave his first concerto in 1800, meanwhile continuing his studies in Kraków. In 1814 he went to Vienna where he took lessons in composition from Hummel. In 1816 Mirecki went to Venice, where he stayed during the years 1816 and 1817. From there, he went to Milan with recommendations to Ricordi, where he became acquainted with several Italian musical notabilities, including Rolla, Pollini, Pacini and Pavesi. Towards the end of 1817, he set out for Paris with recommendations from Ricordi. In 1822, he returned to Milan.

Later he took over the direction of the San Carlo Theater in Lisbon, where he performed a new opera in March 1826.

Later he made a trip to England, and returned from there via Paris to Genoa.

In 1838, he was called to take over the direction of the new dramatic singing school established in his native city of Kraków, a position he held until his death.

Mirecki died on 29 May 1862 in Kraków. He left behind two sons: Stanislaus, who dedicated himself to the art of his father; and Kasimir, who dedicated himself to painting.
