= Jesús de Monasterio =

Spanish violinist and composer

Jesús de Monasterio y Agüeros (21 March 1836 – 28 September 1903) was a Spanish violinist, composer, conductor and teacher. He was one of the main promoters of instrumental music in Madrid during the nineteenth century.

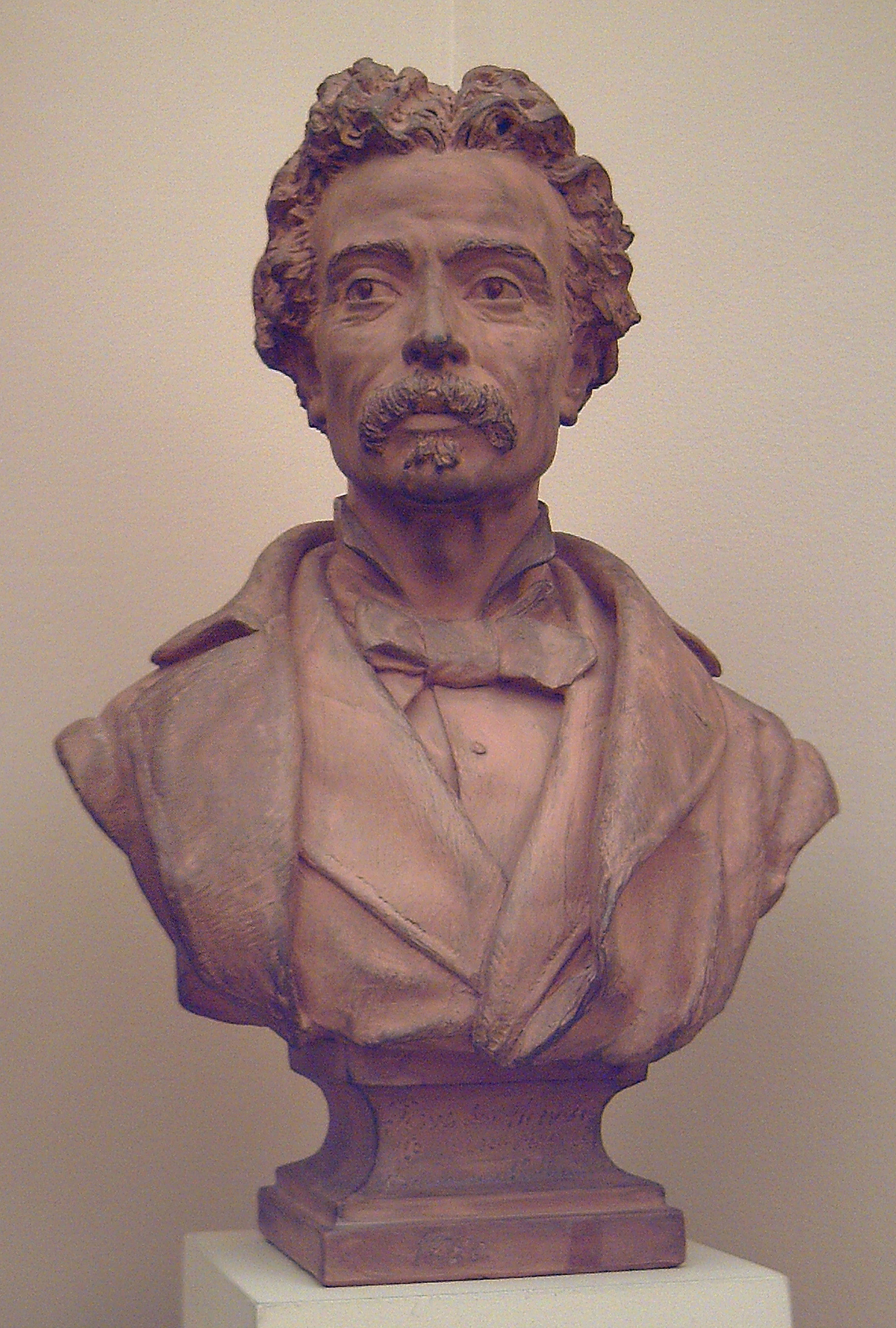
Jesús de Monasterio (V. Vallmitjana, 1880), Academia de San Fernando (Madrid).

== Education ==
De Monasterio was born in Potes, Cantabria. He began studying the violin with his father, an amateur violinist, and he continued learning in Valladolid with José Ortega Zapata. His first public performance was in 1843, during which he astonished the audience with his violin abilities at such a young age. According to the review of that concert in the magazine La Iberia Musical y Literaria, "He caused an inexplicable admiration with the prodigies that he made playing the violin: this little angel, smaller than the instrument he had in hand, was crowned and named partner of merit among a thousand demonstrations of general approval. This innocent child has surprised us, because it is an almost incredible phenomenon seeing so much disposition at so tender an age". He then moved to Madrid to pursue his studies, and received a pension and a violin after playing a concert for the Infanta Isabel de Borbón. During his early formative years numerous press references about him were written in several musical magazines and he was named emeritus partner of several lyceums.

After his father's death in mid 1845, his tutor Basilio Montoya got Monasterio the opportunity to study with Bériot in the Royal Conservatory of Brussels, where he studied harmony with Lemmens, counterpoint with Fétis and completed his literary education with his friend and protector Gevaert. In 1852, he got the Prix extraordinaire at the Conservatoire, which had been delayed because of Monasterio's young age.

== European tours ==
After successfully finishing his studies in Brussels he returned to Madrid to be named honorary violinist of the Capilla Real de Madrid. Then he continued his career as a virtuoso being invited to festivals in England and Scotland and playing with the most influential musicians at that time, like Marie Pleyel or Heinrich Ernst. It was especially admired in London, where he was compared with the most important violinists of his generation. He also played in Belgium, the Netherlands and Germany (where he played his own violin concerto in a recital with Giacomo Meyerbeer). On these tours he used to play some of his own compositions like the Fantasía Característica Española or Adiós a la Alhambra.

== Professor and promoter in Madrid ==
He got the post of professor in the Madrid Conservatory in 1857 (a job that he combined with the post at the Capilla Real de Madrid exerted also since 1857) and became director of that conservatory in 1894. On Bériot's death in 1870 he was offered by Fétis to be professor of the Brussels Conservatoire, but he preferred to stay in Spain.

Monasterio's concern about the state of Spanish chamber music panorama was reflected in the creation along with the pianist Juan María Guelbenzu of the Sociedad de Cuartetos de Madrid in 1863, which put on regular concerts of chamber music for a number of years, specifically until 5 January 1894.

In 1864, he began conducting, becoming in 1869 conductor of the Sociedad de Conciertos de Madrid, in which he promoted orchestral works of the great Romantic and neo-classical composers, until then almost unknown in Spain and in which he increased the technical and artistic level of the orchestra. The Sociedad de Conciertos de Madrid combined the classic repertoire with the release of works by Spanish composers of that time.

He died in Casar de Periedo aged 67.

== Complete catalogue of works ==
=== Instrumental ===
==== Violin and piano ====
- Nocturno (1852, revised 1874)
- Adiós a la Alhambra, Op. 12 (1855)
- Grande fantasie nationale sur des airs populaires espagnoles (1855)
- Pequeña fantasía de de salón, Op. 24 (1860)
- Fiebre de amor (1867)
- Melodía (1874)
- Sierra Morena (1877–83, revised in 1894)

==== Violin and orchestra ====
- Fantasía original española (Fantasía característica española) (1853, revised in 1881)
- Adiós a la Alhambra (1855)
- Grande fantasie nationale sur des airs populaires espagnoles (1855)
- Violin Concerto (1859, rev. 1880)

==== Didactic works ====
- Veinte estudios artísticos de concierto (1878)

==== Orchestral ====
- Adiós a la Alhambra, Op. 12 (1855)
- Andante melódico
- Marcha fúnebre y triumfal (1864)
- Scherzo fantástico (1865, rev, 1866)
- Andante religioso (1872)
- Estudio de concierto (1874)
- Melodía (1876)
- Andantino expresivo

==== Piano solo ====
- La violeta (1849)
- Tristeza. Romanza sin palabras (1861, rev. 1893)
- Scherzo fantástico (4 hands) (1875)
- Adiós a la Alhambra (1897)

=== Vocal ===
==== Voice and piano ====
- La violette et le camélia (1855)
- Las dos hermanas, Op. 16 (1857)
- Acuérdate de Mí (1857)
- El cautivo (1860)
- El trueque (1861)
- Salve para tiple y contralto (1863)
- El cristiano moribundo (1867)
- Desconsuelo de una madre (1867)
- Sí, recuerdo (1868)

==== Non religious works ====
- Le retour des matelots (1855)
- El regreso a la patria (1860)
- Amor de madre (1870)

==== Religious works ====
- Ave verum corpus. Motete a tres voces
- Salve a 4 voces, con acompañamiento de órgano (o piano) op. 30
- Salve a 4 voces, con acompañamiento de orquesta op. 30
- Plegaria a la Santísima Cruz (1872)
- Véante mis ojos (1882)
- Requiescat in pace (1882)
- Álbum de la S.A.R. la Srma. Sra. Infanta Dª. Isabel de Borbón (1883)
- O vos omnes (1883)
- Cántico a la Santísima Virgen, a dos voces con acompañamiento de órgano o piano (1884)
- Plegaria a 4 voces solas (1886)
- O sacrum Convivium, Motete al Santísimo Sacramento, para tenor con acompañamiento de órgano (1897)
- Invitatio Christum Regem saeculorum (1903)
