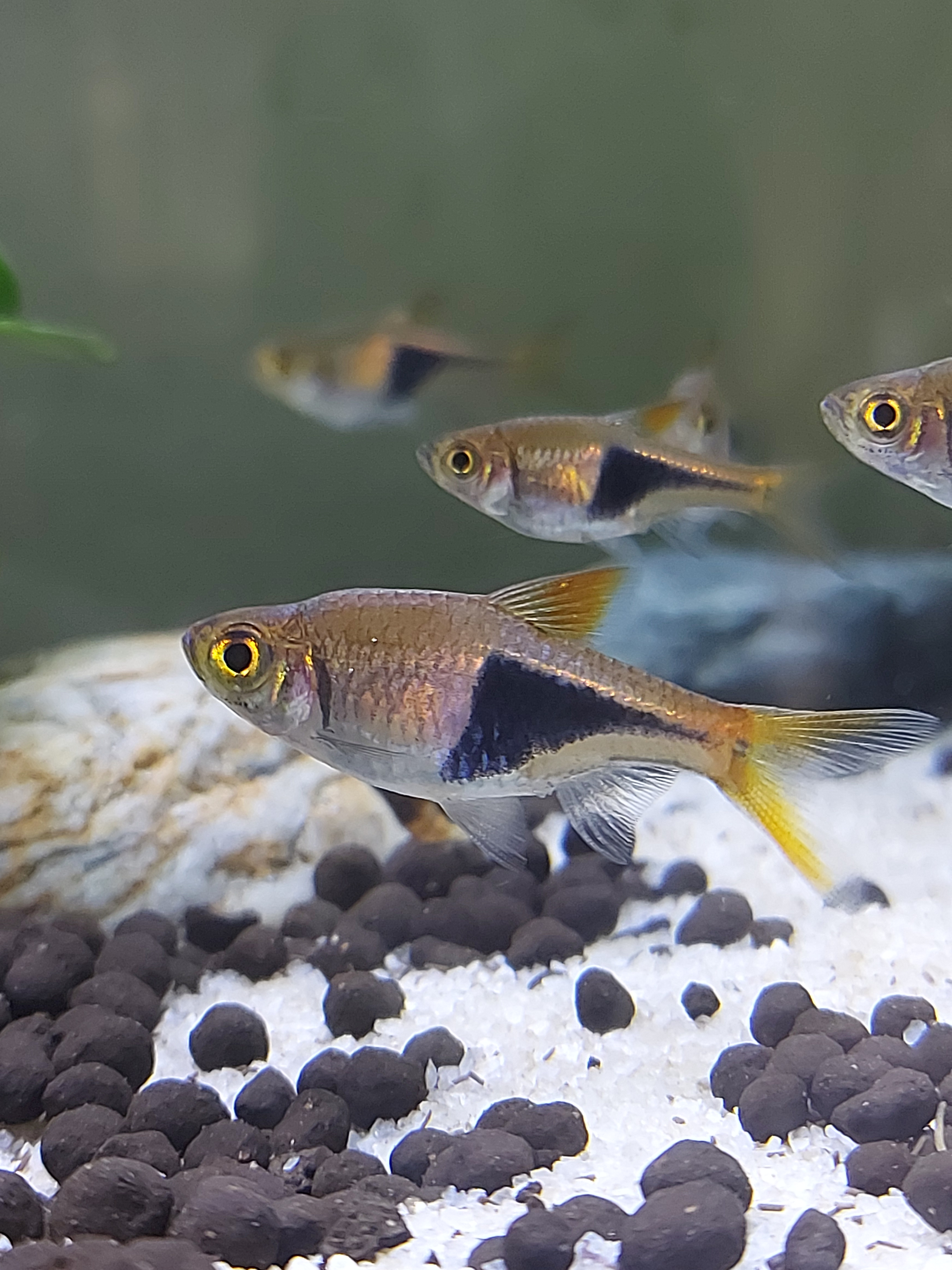

Conservation status
- Least Concern (IUCN 3.1)

Scientific classification
- Kingdom: Animalia
- Phylum: Chordata
- Class: Actinopterygii
- Order: Cypriniformes
- Family: Danionidae
- Subfamily: Rasborinae
- Genus: Trigonostigma
- Species: T. heteromorpha

Binomial name
- Trigonostigma heteromorpha (Duncker, 1904)

Synonyms
- Rasbora heteromorpha Duncker, 1904

= Harlequin rasbora =

Species of fish

The harlequin rasbora (Trigonostigma heteromorpha) is a small fish in the family Cyprinidae. The species became an instant favorite among aquarists after its introduction in the early 1900s and is the best known and most widely kept species among the rasboras. In 1935, an image of a trio of harlequin rasboras, stamped in 14k gold, graced the cover of the first edition of William T. Innes's classic Exotic Aquarium Fishes, and remained through all 19 editions.

== Etymology and taxonomy ==
The species was originally classified into the genus Rasbora, and given the specific name heteromorpha (Greek, "differently shaped") to alludes to the fact that its body shape differed from other members of that genus. The common name alludes to the black triangular patch on the body, reminiscent of the patterns found on the costume of a harlequin.

== Description ==
The harlequin rasbora is a fish that has an approximately lozenge-shaped body, whose basal colour from the head to the caudal peduncle is an orange-pink, the exact hue varying depending upon such factors as water conditions and the original population from which the fish was obtained. The posterior half of the body is overlaid with a large, roughly triangular black marking, that tapers toward the terminal end of the caudal peduncle, and begins approximately below the midpoint of the attachment of the dorsal fin (commonly called a "black wedge"). In common with all cyprinids, the articulation of the pectoral and pelvic fins follows a familiar pattern, the pectoral fins being located immediately posterior to the operculum or gill cover, whilst the pelvic fins are located some way farther back along the ventral portion of the body, in this case almost directly in a vertical line drawn through the dorsal fin. This relationship between the pectoral and pelvic fins is seen in characins as well as cyprinids, and is a feature of all the ostariophysans (fishes possessing an auxiliary mechanism for detecting sound consisting of a set of internal bones called the Weberian ossicles).

The dorsal, anal, caudal and pelvic fins are all tinted red, the caudal fin being forked, with the red colour concentrated in the outermost rays, the inner section of the tail fin being more hyaline.

It is possible to confuse this fish with two similar species that were indeed originally considered to be subspecies of T. heteromorpha, namely Trigonostigma espei and Trigonostigma hengeli. These fishes are more slender in body shape than T. heteromorpha, and the black marking, instead of being approximately triangular, has a horizontal stripe which tapers towards the caudal peduncle, and is greatly thickened and extended downwards below the dorsal fin. Due to this fishes with this marking are commonly known as "lamb chop rasboras" due to its perceived resemblance to the butchery cut known as a lamb chop.

A fully mature individual harlequin rasbora attains a standard length of 4 cm～4.5 cm, the maximum length can reach two inches (5.1 cm).

Males are cited as possessing a slightly larger black body patch than females, with the section adjoining the anal fin being more rounded in males. Ripe females are noticeably fuller in body outline.

== Distribution and habitat ==
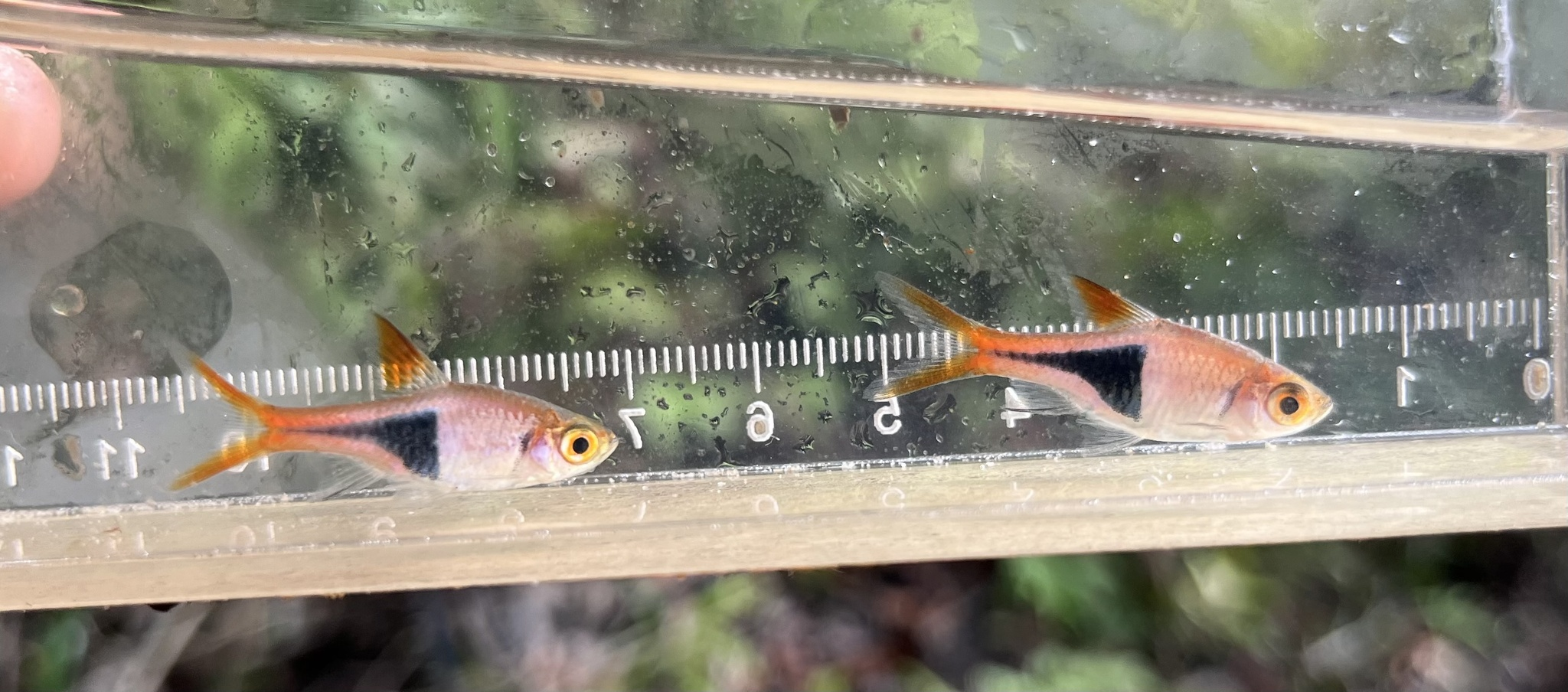
In Malaysia, showing size

The harlequin rasbora is a native of the Malay Peninsula, Singapore, Sumatra and Borneo. Populations distributed in southern Thailand were found to be of the related species Trigonostigma truncata in 2020. It inhabits streams and other watercourses characterised principally by low mineral content, high concentrations of dissolved humic acids, a consequence of those waters flowing through peat swamp forests. The waterlogged soils of these forests inhibit the complete decay of leaf litter, resulting in the formation of peat, which leaches humic acids and related compounds into the watercourses flowing through these forests. The conditions thus resemble those found on a different continent, namely the blackwater habitats of South America, and the water chemistry of the Asian habitats of the harlequin rasbora is accordingly similar to that of the Rio Negro.

== Aquarium maintenance ==
Despite the relatively uniform water chemistry of its various habitats, the harlequin rasbora is an adaptable fish in the aquarium, provided that migration of the fishes to waters of differing chemical parameters is conducted with due care. The fish will live in an aquarium in waters ranging from a pH of 6.0 to 7.8, and hardness ranges from zero to 15°dH. However, while for maintenance purposes water chemistry is not critical provided that cleanliness of the aquarium is maintained, for breeding purposes the water chemistry becomes considerably more so (see below). The temperature range of the harlequin rasbora is usually cited as 22 to 27 °C (72 to 81 °F) (for example, Walker, 1971, p. 101) but the fish is capable of living in temperatures from 21 to 28 °C (70 to 82 °F), and indeed usually breeds at around 28 °C (82 °F).

The harlequin rasbora is a shoaling fish, and should be kept in a group comprising a minimum of six individuals, though shoals of larger numbers are preferable not only from the standpoint of the well-being of the fish, but from an aesthetic standpoint—a large shoal of harlequin rasboras presents a striking vista even to non-fishkeepers, and their active disposition in the water adds to the spectacle. Being a peaceful species, the harlequin rasbora may be maintained in a community aquarium set-up with other similarly sized and peaceful aquarium fishes, including many of the small characins from South America (the similarity in water chemistry of the two habitats for these different fishes has already been covered), assorted small barbs, danios, other small rasboras, Corydoras catfishes, Otocinclus catfishes and others.

An aquarium intended to house harlequin rasboras should be planted with live plants, with some open areas for swimming provided between stands of plants such as Cryptocoryne species, these being among the plants that inhabit the harlequin rasbora's native waters. Likewise, some Asiatic species of Aponogeton may be utilised. Bushy plants such as Cabomba may also be used in the aquarium, but this genus of plants requires intense lighting, while the Cryptocoryne and Aponogeton species prefer more subdued lighting, as does the harlequin rasbora, so if the aquarist wishes to have a variety of plants in the aquarium, other species that prefer subdued lighting are better choices. Filtration should provide modest currents (most of the home watercourses inhabited by the fish are relatively slow moving) but still provide sufficient filtration turnover to maintain aquarium cleanliness.

Feeding the harlequin rasbora presents no problems to the aquarist, as the fish enthusiastically accepts prepared foods, though for best health, a variety of these should be given, preferably interspersed with feedings of live foods such as Daphnia. For breeding purposes, conditioning with live foods is likely to boost success by a considerable margin, though even heavy live feeding will not induce spawning if the water chemistry is incorrect (see below). If available, mosquito larvae make an excellent conditioning food for this species.

The lifespan of the harlequin rasbora has not been systematically determined, but individuals in the aquarium can be expected, with good care, to live for five to eight years.

== Reproduction ==
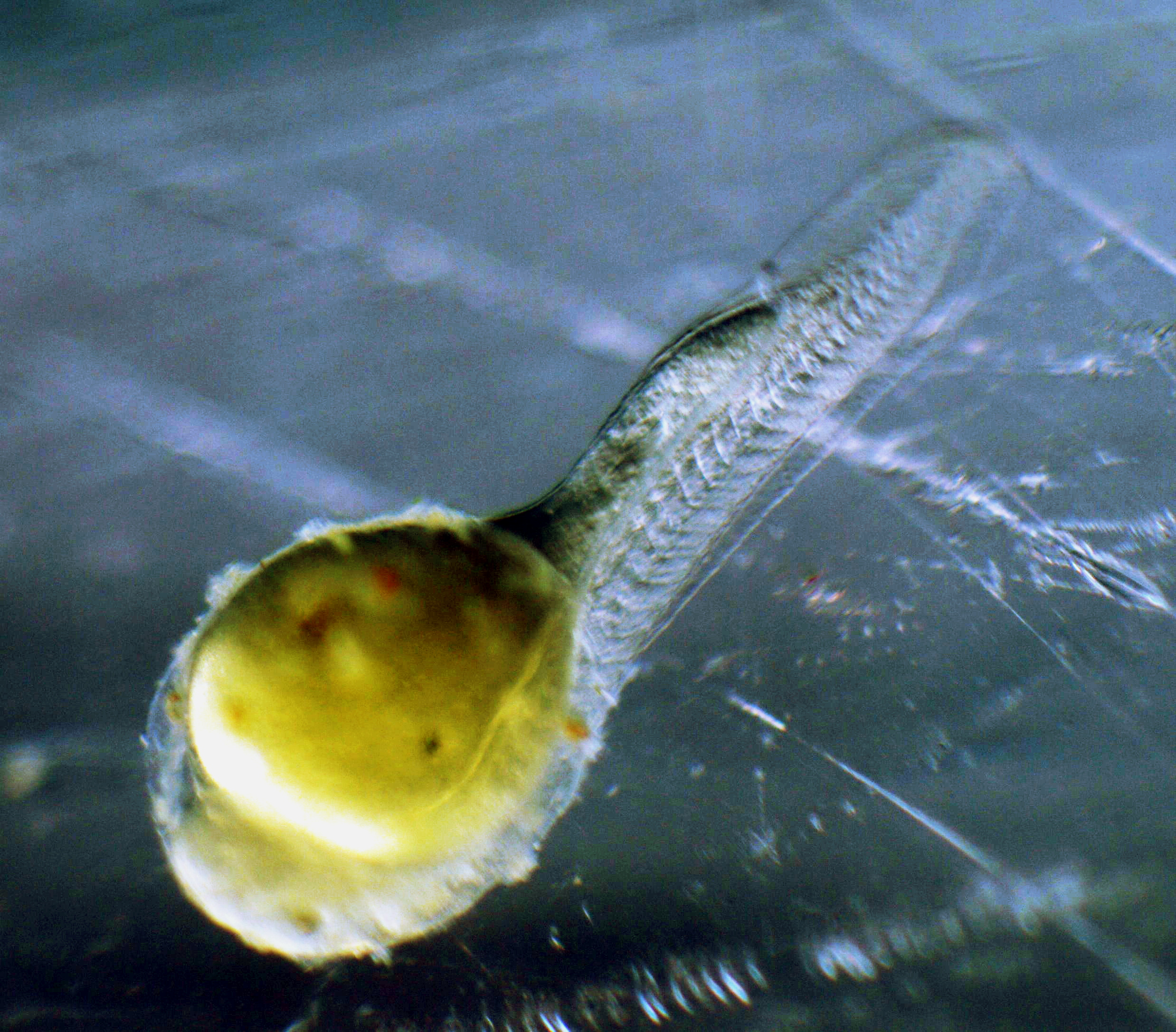
T. espei egg, 22 hours

The harlequin rasbora differs considerably from the other popular rasboras in the aquarium with respect to breeding. While other rasboras are egg-scattering spawners, the harlequin rasbora deposits adhesive eggs on the underside of the leaves of plants such as Cryptocoryne and Aponogeton. The female will swim in an inverted position beneath a chosen leaf, rub her belly along the leaf in preparation for spawning, this action seemingly encouraging the male to join in spawning. When the male joins the female, he adopts a similar inverted position alongside her, and as the female extrudes her eggs and attaches them to the underside of the leaf, the male curls his tail fin around the body of the female and with a trembling motion, emits the sperm that will fertilise the eggs. Six to 12 eggs at a time are deposited in this fashion with each such embrace, and the fish repeat this course of action over a period of two hours or more, during which a large and well-conditioned female may deposit as many as 300 eggs, though 80 to 100 is a more typical number.

The breeding aquarium for the harlequin rasbora requires the presence of suitable plants—Cryptocoryne species being the premier choice. The water in the breeding aquarium must be soft and acidic, as the fish are unlikely to spawn in hard, alkaline water, and furthermore egg fertility appears to be adversely affected in such conditions even if the parents do spawn. Aquarists intent upon simulating natural conditions as closely as possible may choose to filter the aquarium water over peat, thus replicating the humic acid concentrations found in the fish's native waters, though this is not absolutely necessary if the basic water chemistry parameters (no higher than 4°dH hardness, pH around 6.4) are correctly maintained. Temperature for breeding should be 28 °C (82 °F), and the parent fish should be conditioned heavily with live foods such as Daphnia and mosquito larvae prior to the spawning attempt. Once spawning is completed, the parent fishes should be removed from the breeding aquarium to prevent instances of egg eating, which may occur with this species.

An excellent illustration (black-and-white photo) may be found in William T. Innes' book Exotic Aquarium Fishes on page 171, illustrating the inverted position adopted by the female during the preparation for spawning.

== Development ==
Fertile harlequin rasbora eggs require approximately 18 hours to hatch at a temperature of 28 °C. Upon hatching, the fry are translucent, around three to four millimetres long, and remain attached to the leaf upon which the eggs were laid for a further 12 to 24 hours, during which the yolk sac is absorbed. Once this process is completed, the fishes become free-swimming, and at this stage, require very fine sizes of food such as live infusoria for a period of seven to 14 days, after which the fry are able to feed upon newly hatched brine shrimp. If infusoria are unavailable, commercial prepared foods for egglayer fry may also be used.

The harlequin rasbora takes approximately eight to ten weeks for the fry to assume full adult colouration.

== See also ==
- List of freshwater aquarium fish species
