= TFH =

TFH may refer to:

== Arts and entertainment ==
- TFH Publications, an American pet book publisher
- The Flat Hat, a newspaper at the College of William & Mary, Virginia, US
- Them's Fightin' Herds, a 2020 video game
- Tropical Fish Hobbyist, an American fishkeeping magazine
- The Falcon's Hangar, a Singaporean toy distributor

== Other uses ==
- Tin-foil hat, headgear and a stereotype
- Follicular B helper T cells (T_{FH}), in biology
- Thomas F. Hogan (born 1938), American judge
- Touch for health, or applied kinesiology, in alternative medicine
