= Greffuhle Stradivarius =

18th Century violin made by Antonio Stradivari

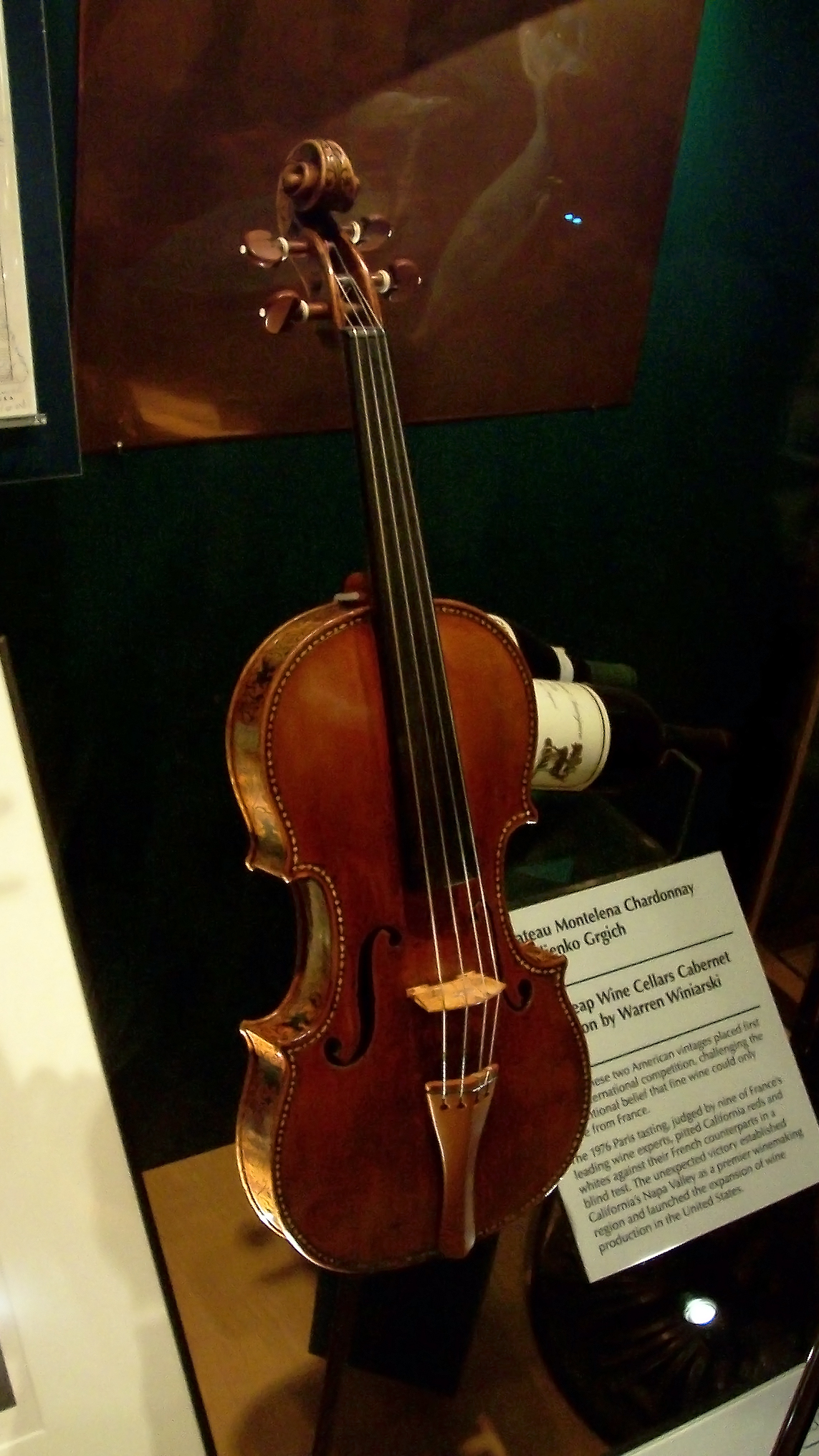
The Greffuhle Stradivarius violin, on display in the Smithsonian Institution National Museum of American History.

The Greffuhle Stradivarius is a violin made by Antonio Stradivari of Cremona, Italy, around the year 1709. It derives its name from a French nobleman who once owned it. The Greffuhle is one of the eleven Stradivarius instruments that are decorated.

Like the decorated Stradivarius violins in the Spanish Royal Collection, the instrument has a label with a date of 1709. The decoration is elaborate inlay motif of flowers, vines, and animals, the designs conceived by Stradivari himself. The purfling is a wide band of inlaid ivory diamonds and circles on an ebony background. The violin's top plate is made of two-piece spruce with even medium-to-fine grain broadening toward the sides. The back is one-piece maple with narrow, nearly horizontal flame figure; the ribs are of similar maple. The neck is made of modern maple, terminating in the original pegbox and scroll.

It was donated to the Smithsonian Institution in 1997 by Herbert R. Axelrod as part of the Axelrod quartet.
