= William T. Innes =

American aquarist, author, photographer, printer and publisher

William Thornton Innes III, L.H.D. (February 2, 1874 – February 27, 1969) was an American aquarist, author, photographer, printer and publisher. Innes was the author of numerous influential books and hundreds of articles about aquarium fish, aquatic plants and aquarium maintenance during the formative years of the aquarium hobby in America. Born in Philadelphia, he was the founder, publisher and editor of The Aquarium, the first successful national magazine dedicated to aquarists. The magazine ran monthly for thirty-five years from May 1932 through January 1967.

== Early life ==
Innes was born in Philadelphia in 1874. After graduating from Friends' Central School in 1892, he entered the printing concern of his father, Innes and Sons, in 1895. He first became involved with fishkeeping when a friend from the Columbia Photographic Society introduced him to the Philadelphia Aquarium Society in 1906. He soon began actively participating in the Aquarium Society, eventually becoming the organization's secretary and president.

In 1899 he married Mary Weber Weaver. From the 1920s he organized aquarium shows in Philadelphia's Horticultural Hall.

== Exotic Aquarium Fishes ==
=== Original ===
Innes is best remembered as author and publisher of the book, Exotic Aquarium Fishes, which was issued by his family's printing firm in Philadelphia in 1935 and went through nineteen editions. Produced by Innes' own printing firm, the book also included photographs taken by Innes for each of the fish species. He had decided that the Kodachrome film of the day required too much light and did not accurately show the true colors of various fishes. Instead, Innes invented a coloring process for black and white photographs, called an Innes Plate, hand-painted, test-printed, and then repainted to fine-tune the color for publication.

These color photos, considered works of art by many, became the object of a lawsuit some years later. Dr. Herbert Axelrod had used these photos from Exotic Aquarium Fishes in a book produced by his publishing company, TFH Publications. Innes sued and won the case in 1955, but was awarded only $1, plus court costs, since the court could not determine that any monetary damage had been done.

Of Exotic Aquarium Fishes, historian Samantha Muka stated in 2022 that the book, written by the "acknowledged 'godfather' of [the] community", was considered essential among the aquarist community, "bind[ing] the hobbyist community together and giv[ing[ them shared history and basic definitions and rhetoric upon which to converse," as well as providing them a "shared historical narrative in the field".

=== Later editions ===
Innes hoped that the book would be updated on a regular basis, even after his death, and collaborated with younger friend and colleague, Dr. George S. Myers, to that end. After Innes Publishing ended its production of the book, other entities published more economical editions. When Innes failed to renew the copyright of the first edition, Axelrod published new versions. The original nineteen editions published by Innes, still sought and collected by aquarists, can be identified by their dark green, "leatherette" covers and binding, featuring an image of a trio of harlequin rasboras stamped in 14k gold.

== Other work ==
Other books for which he served as author, publisher, principal photographer and printer include Goldfish Varieties and Tropical Aquarium Fishes (1917) which ran through fifteen editions by 1935; The Modern Aquarium (1929); Your Aquarium (1945); Goldfish Varieties and Water Gardens (1947); and Aquarium Highlights (1951).

Innes supported eugenics, writing in 1923: “Marvelous results have been attained through selective breeding, not only in goldfish, but in almost every kind of animal and plant in which certain points are desired. The science of eugenics, of which we frequently hear nowadays, proposes to apply the science of proper selection to the breeding of a better human race. Why not?”

== Honors ==
Dr. Myers, who first described the neon tetra, had named that fish Hyphessobrycon innesi in honor of Innes. This popular aquarium species was later moved to the genus Paracheirodon and is now known as Paracheirodon innesi. The neon tetra is perhaps the best-known of several fish species that have been named in honor of this pioneer in the aquarium hobby. A water lily cultivar of the genus Nymphaea has also been named in his honor.

Temple University conferred upon him an honorary Doctor of Humanities degree in 1951.

On the occasion of Dr. Innes's 80th birthday in 1954, Dr. Myers wrote a tribute to him, in the February issue of The Aquarium, referring to William T. Innes as "the best known and most respected aquarist and authority on aquariums in the world. His books, his photographs and his influence on this field have educated millions."

An extensive collection of his writings, sketches, photographs and correspondence is housed at the American Philosophical Society in Philadelphia.

== Publications ==
- Exotic Aquarium Fishes, 1st edition, Innes & Sons Publishing Co., Philadelphia, PA 1935
- Exotic Aquarium Fishes, 19th edition, revised, Metaframe, Maywood, NJ 1966
- The Aquarium, "Innes Anniversary Issue", Vol. XXIII, No. 2, February 1954

== See also ==
- Category:Taxa named by William T. Innes
