= Schultzites =

Conservation status
- Data Deficient (IUCN 3.1)

Scientific classification
- Kingdom: Animalia
- Phylum: Chordata
- Class: Actinopterygii
- Order: Characiformes
- Family: incertae sedis
- Genus: Schultzites; Géry, 1964
- Species: S. axelrodi

Binomial name
- Schultzites axelrodi Géry, 1964

Genus of fishes

Schultzites is a monospecific genus of freshwater ray-finned fish belonging to the suborder Characoidei within the order Characiformes, the characins. The only species in the genus is Schultzites axelrodi, which is endemic to Colombia, where it is found in the upper Meta River basin. This taxon has not been assigned to a particular family within the Characoidei and is considered to be incertae sedis, i.e. its taxonomic affinities are, as yet, unclear.

Schultzites, the genus, was named in honor of Leonard Peter Schultz, Curator of Fishes, U. S. National Museum, for his "tremendous ichthyological works". The specific name honors the pet-book publisher Herbert R. Axelrod, whose Tropical Fish Hobbyist magazine published this description and several others by Jacques Géry.
