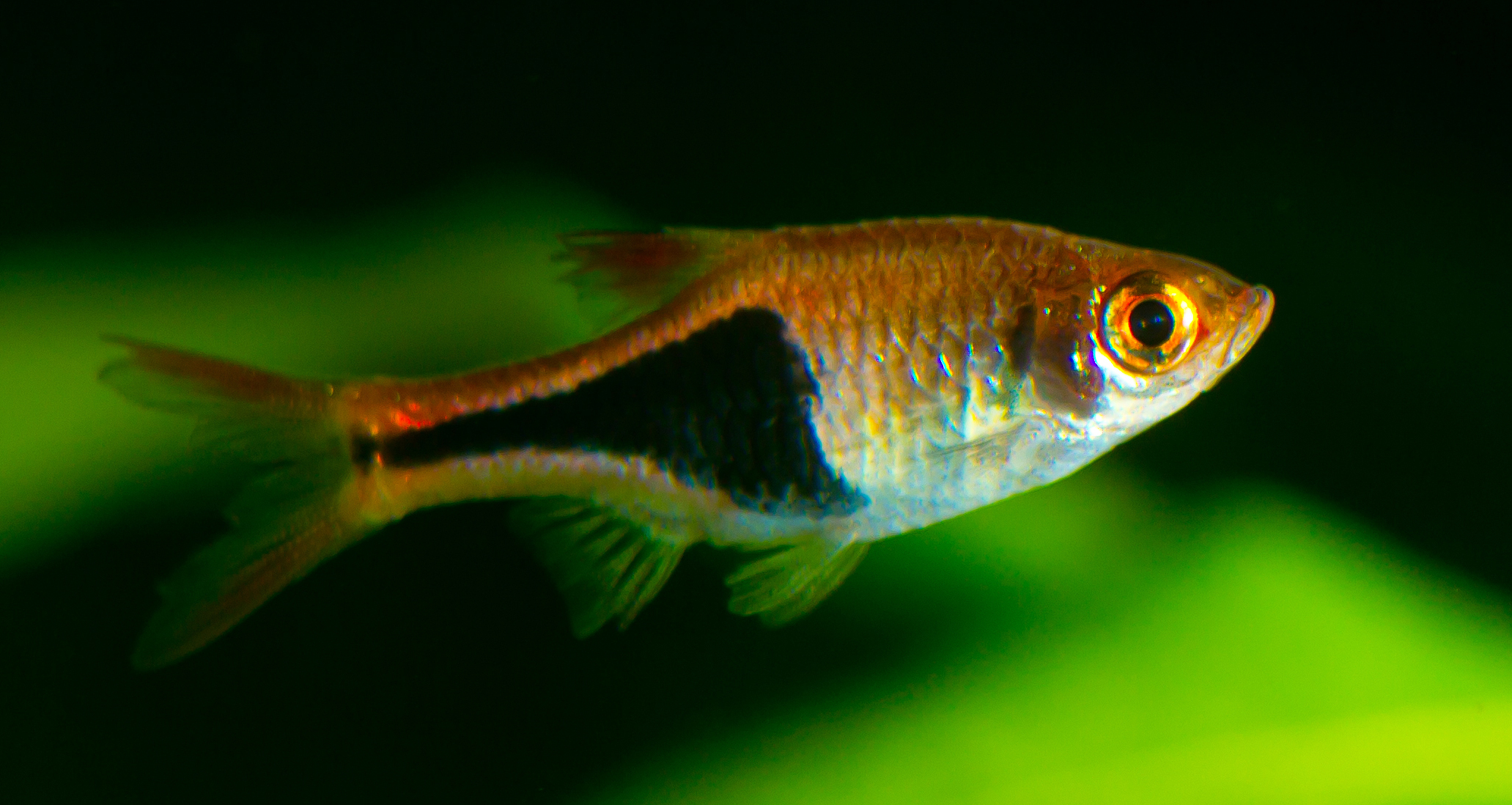
- Harlequin rasbora, Trigonostigma heteromorpha

Scientific classification
- Kingdom: Animalia
- Phylum: Chordata
- Class: Actinopterygii
- Order: Cypriniformes
- Family: Danionidae
- Subfamily: Rasborinae
- Genus: Trigonostigma; Kottelat & K. E. Witte, 1999

Type species
- Rasbora heteromorpha Duncker, 1904

= Trigonostigma =

Genus of fishes

Trigonostigma is a genus of small freshwater ray-finned fishes belonging to the family Danionidae. The fishes in this genus are found in Southeast Asia. These social, colorful freshwater fish are often kept in aquariums.

== Species ==
There are currently five recognized species in this genus:

Species	Common name	Image
Trigonostigma espei (Meinken, 1967)	Espei rasbora	
Trigonostigma hengeli (Meinken, 1956)	Glowlight rasbora	
Trigonostigma heteromorpha (Duncker, 1904)	Harlequin rasbora	
Trigonostigma somphongsi (Meinken, 1958)	Somphong's rasbora	
Trigonostigma truncata (Tan, 2020)		
