= Stradivarius Palatinos =

Set of five instruments by Antonio Stradivari

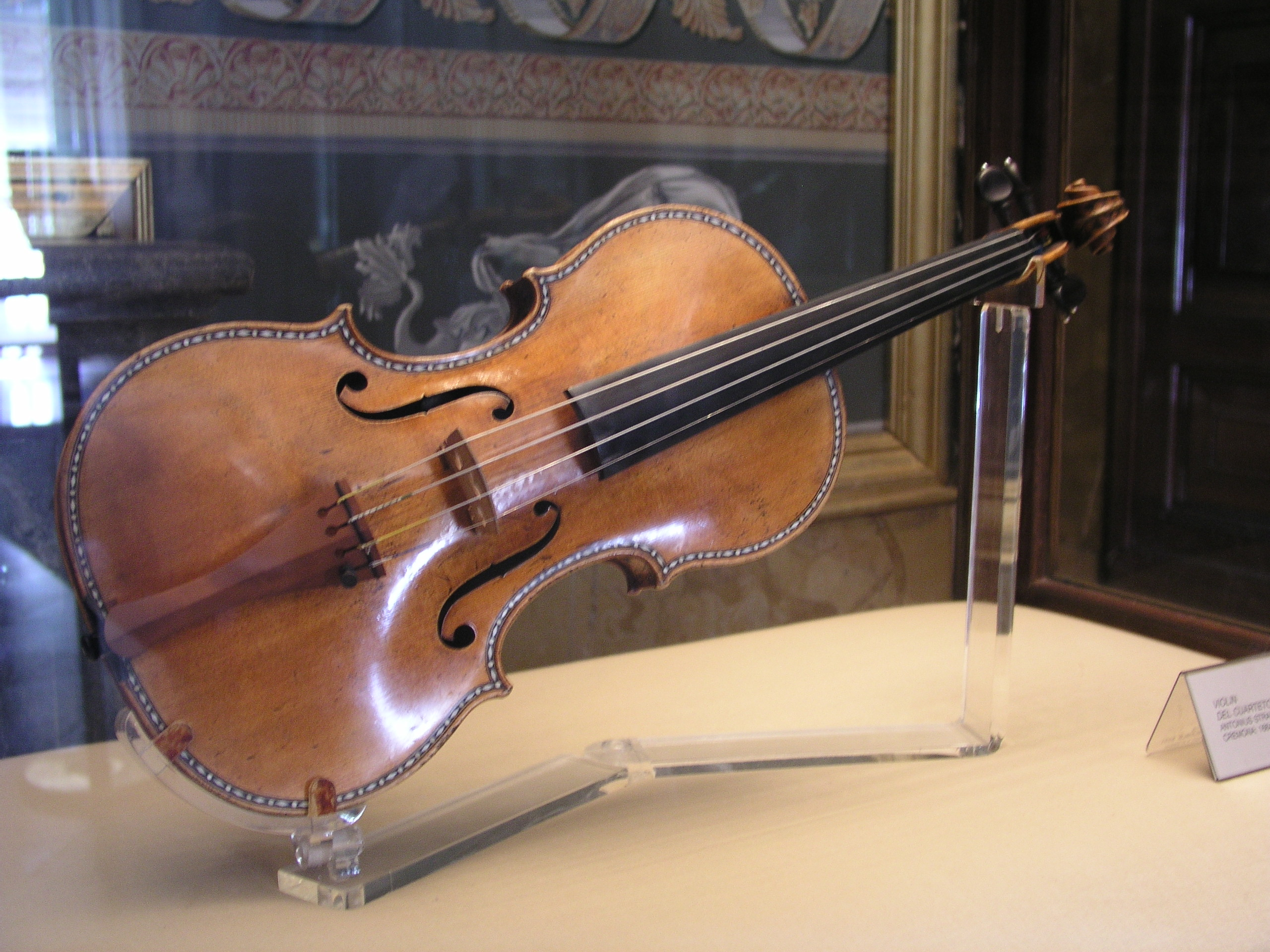
One of the violins

The Stradivarius Palatinos or Palatines, are a set of five string instruments made by Antonio Stradivari around 1700. They are kept in Madrid's Royal Palace. The term "Palatino" can in this case be translated as "court" instruments, as it refers to their belonging to the Spanish royal collection.

Four of the five are decorated instruments known as the Royal Quartet (also referred to in Spanish as Palatino or Coral): they comprise 2 violins, a viola and a cello. There is also another (non-decorated) cello.

== The Royal Quartet ==
Decorated instruments are rare in Stradivari' output, and so are sets of instruments. A few of his clients are known to have acquired sets, for example, Ferdinando de' Medici, Grand Prince of Tuscany (son of Cosimo III de' Medici, Grand Duke of Tuscany). In the case of the Palatinos, Stradivari intended to present them to the king of Spain but was not able to do so during his lifetime.

An ensemble of 2 violins, a viola and a cello is what is referred to in classical music as a string quartet, and many works have been written for this combination since the 18th century. For example, the Spanish royal family was the patron of Boccherini, who wrote over a hundred works in this genre. However, Stradivari never heard the type of composition known as a "string quartet", the format emerged after his death. The project to provide instruments for the Spanish court evidently envisaged a different ensemble, as instead of having only one viola, the set originally included two.

=== Violas ===
There were originally two violas of different size in the set (tenor and alto). Both of the violas went missing at the time of the Napoleonic Wars. Only the alto was retrieved. The loss of the tenor viola has made a limited difference to the ensemble in the sense that the alto voicing has become the normal one for violas.

==== Alto viola ====
The alto viola is dated 1696. It returned to Madrid in the 20th century after having come into the possession of the dealer W.E. Hill & Sons of London. It is one of thirteen known extant violas by Stradivari. It is unusual in being decorated, although a tenor viola in Florence (discussed below) is adorned with the Medici crest on the fingerboard.

==== Tenor viola ====
The missing viola was larger and is believed to have been a tenor. The "Medici" tenor viola by Stradivari in the Musical Instruments Museum in Florence also had an alto pair: they were both part of a set belonging to the Medici court. The role of tenors would have been to play the lower register viola lines or second viola in five-part harmony depending on instrumentation.

=== Violins ===
The two violins are of different sizes. They have labels bearing a date of 1709. This dating is accepted by some authorities, although it has been suggested that the instruments are slightly older.

=== Cello ===
The cello is not in its original playing condition, having been modernised. It is reported to be in a good state of conservation after the repair of damage sustained during a photographic session en 2012.

== Conservation and use ==
The instruments are in the care of the Spanish heritage organisation Patrimonio Nacional. In 2024 it was reported by El País that years had gone by without the instruments being played together. However, they are allowed to be played on occasion. Musicians who have played them in the 21st century include the Quatuor Mosaïques (an Austrian group which specialises in period instruments) and Spain's Cuarteto Quiroga, which was granted a "residency" with the instruments. In January 2025 the instruments left the Royal Palace with a police escort for the short journey to the Teatro Real. There they were played in a concert given by the Cuarteto Casals in aid of districts which suffered in the "dana" (the 2024 Spanish floods).

== Recordings ==
The Quatuor Mosaïques recorded the instruments in 2006, releasing a CD of works by Arriaga.

== Gallery ==
The five instruments

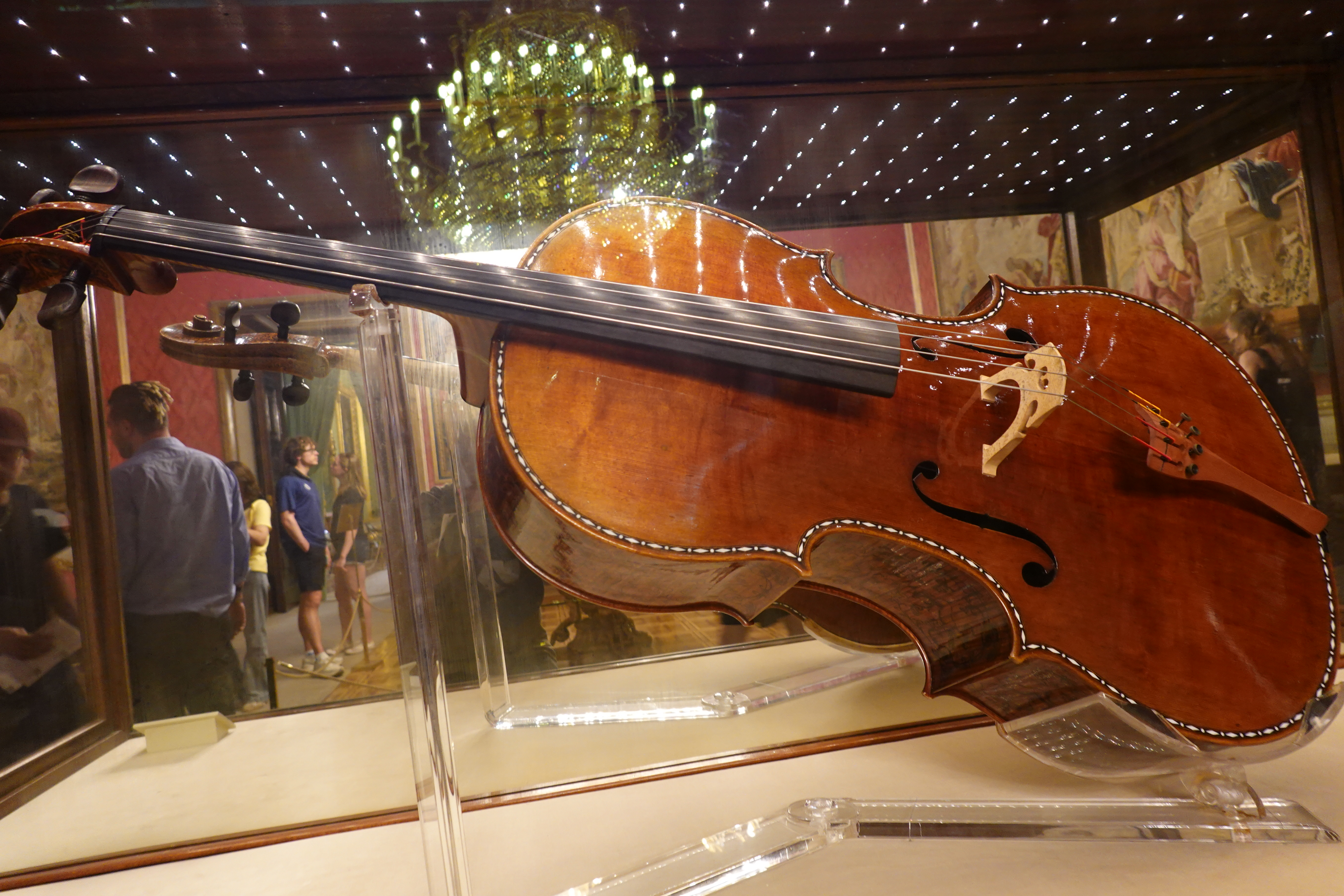
Violonchelo del Cuarteto Real

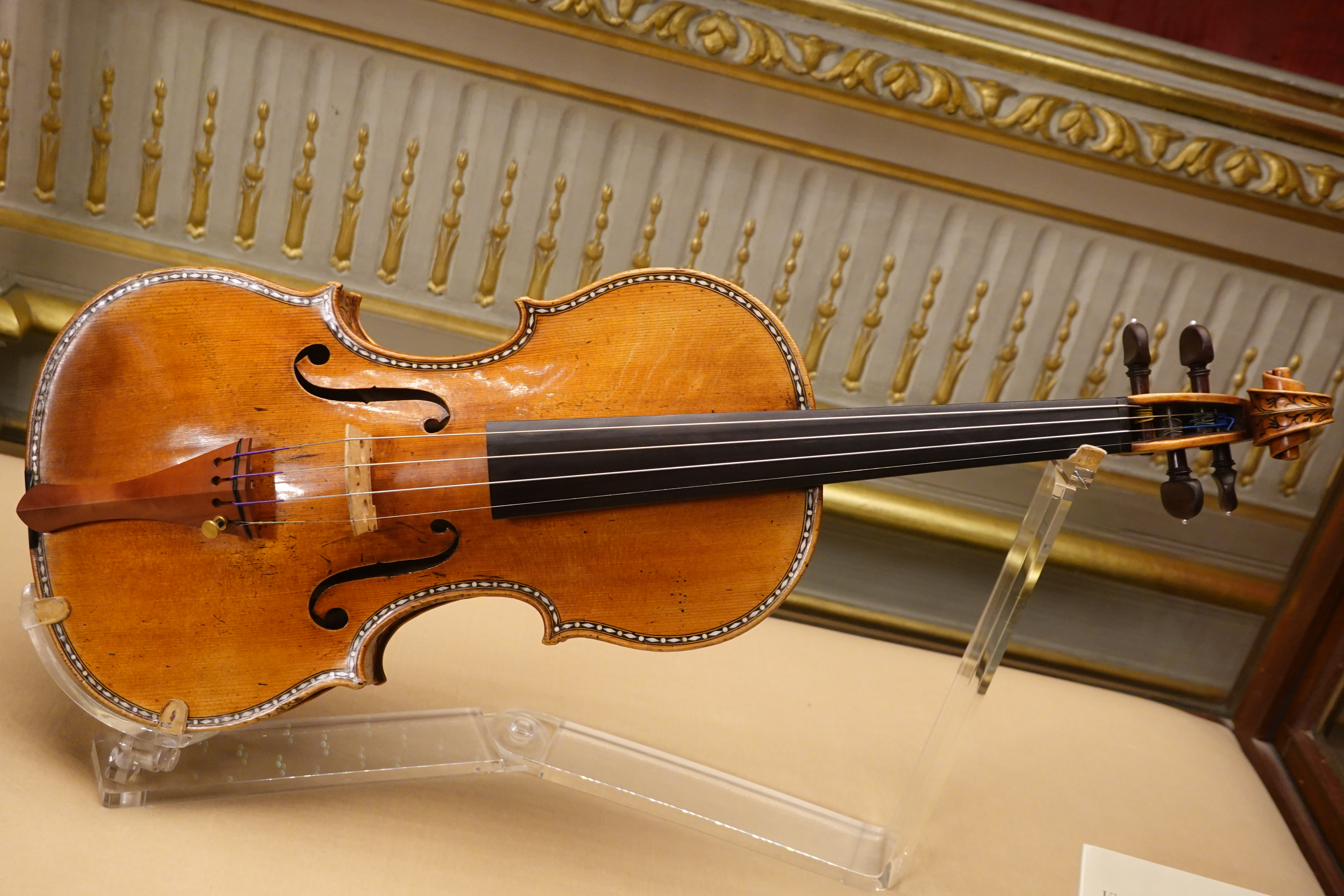
Violin grande del Cuarteto Real

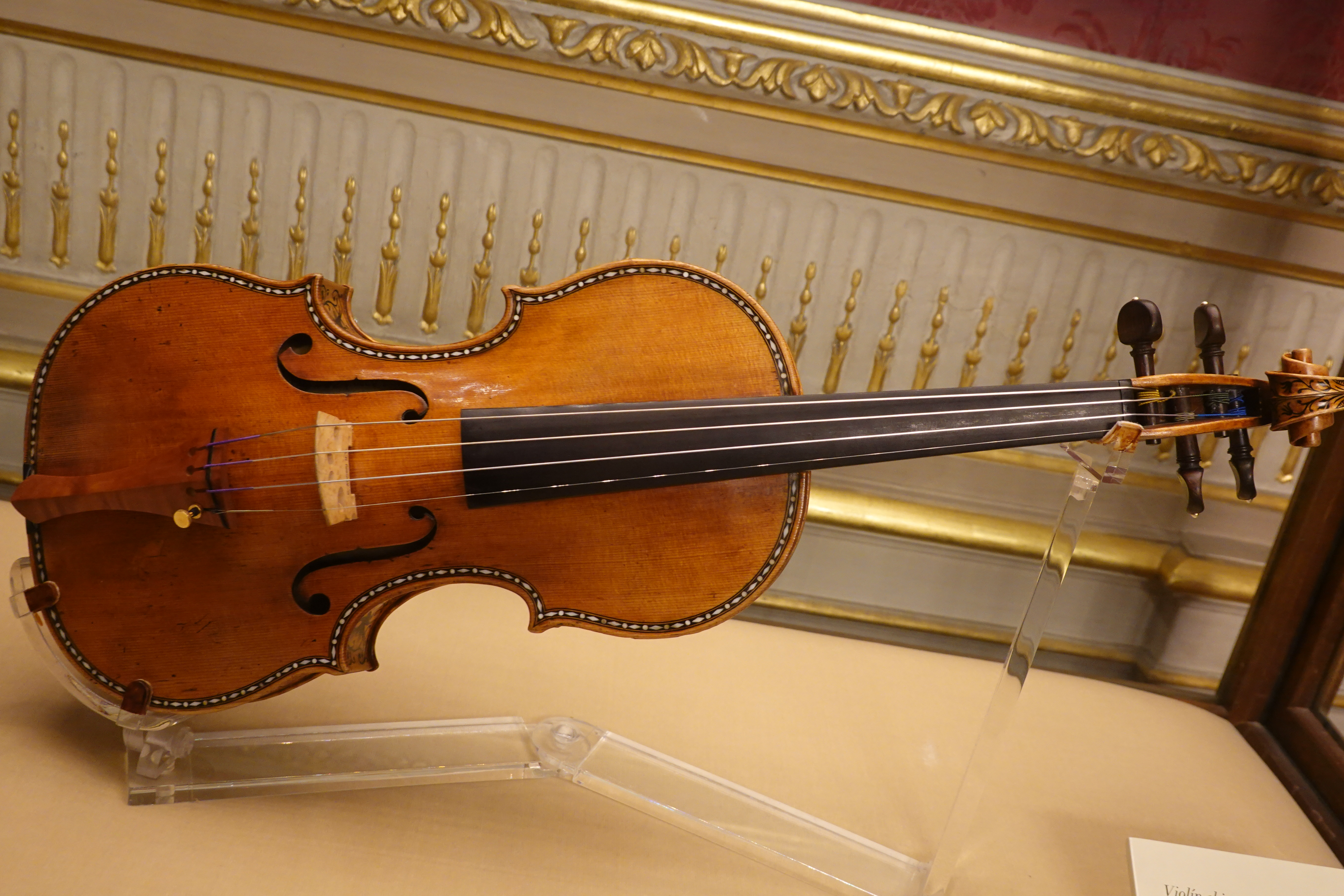
Violín chico del Cuarteto Real

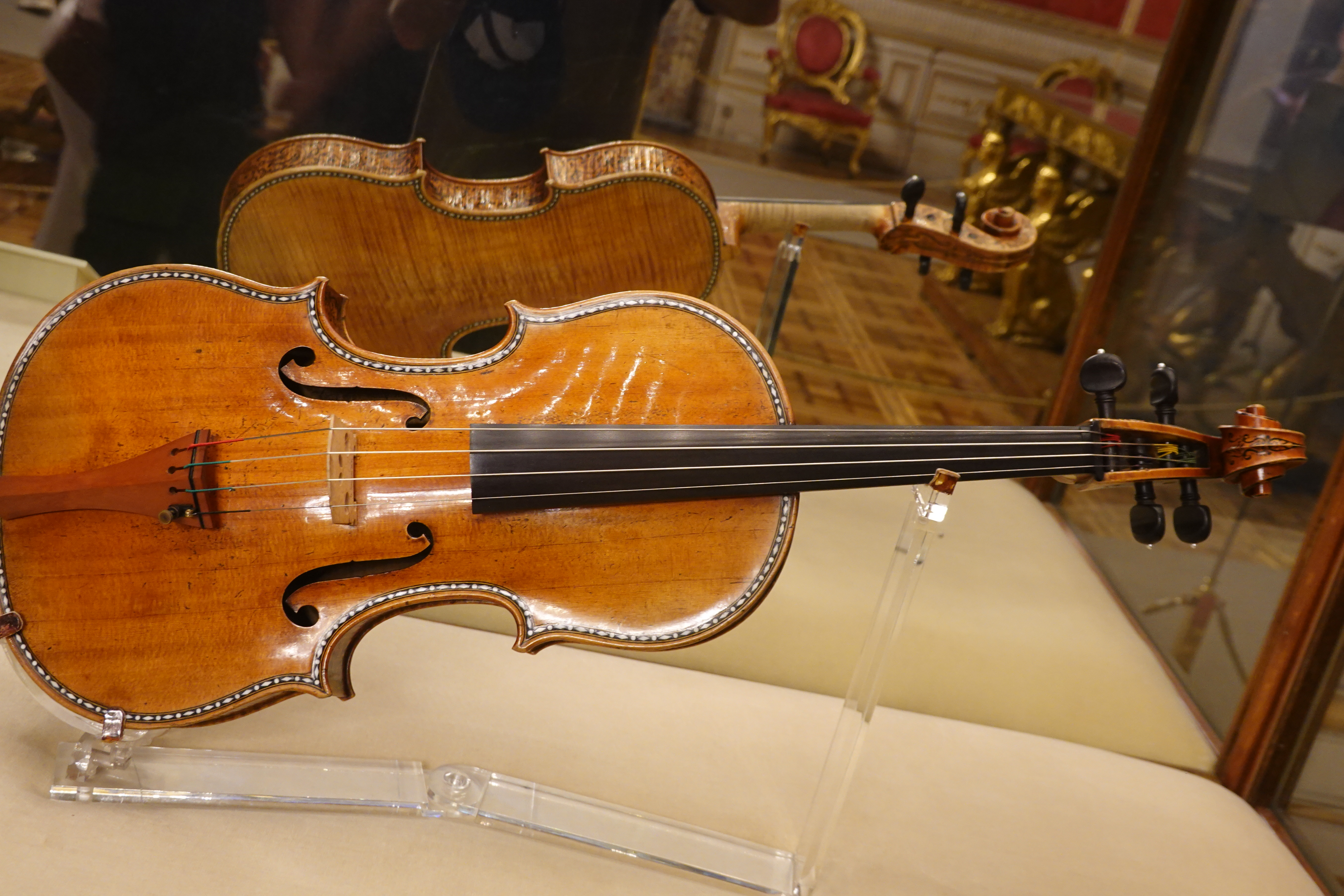
Viola contralto del Cuarteto Real

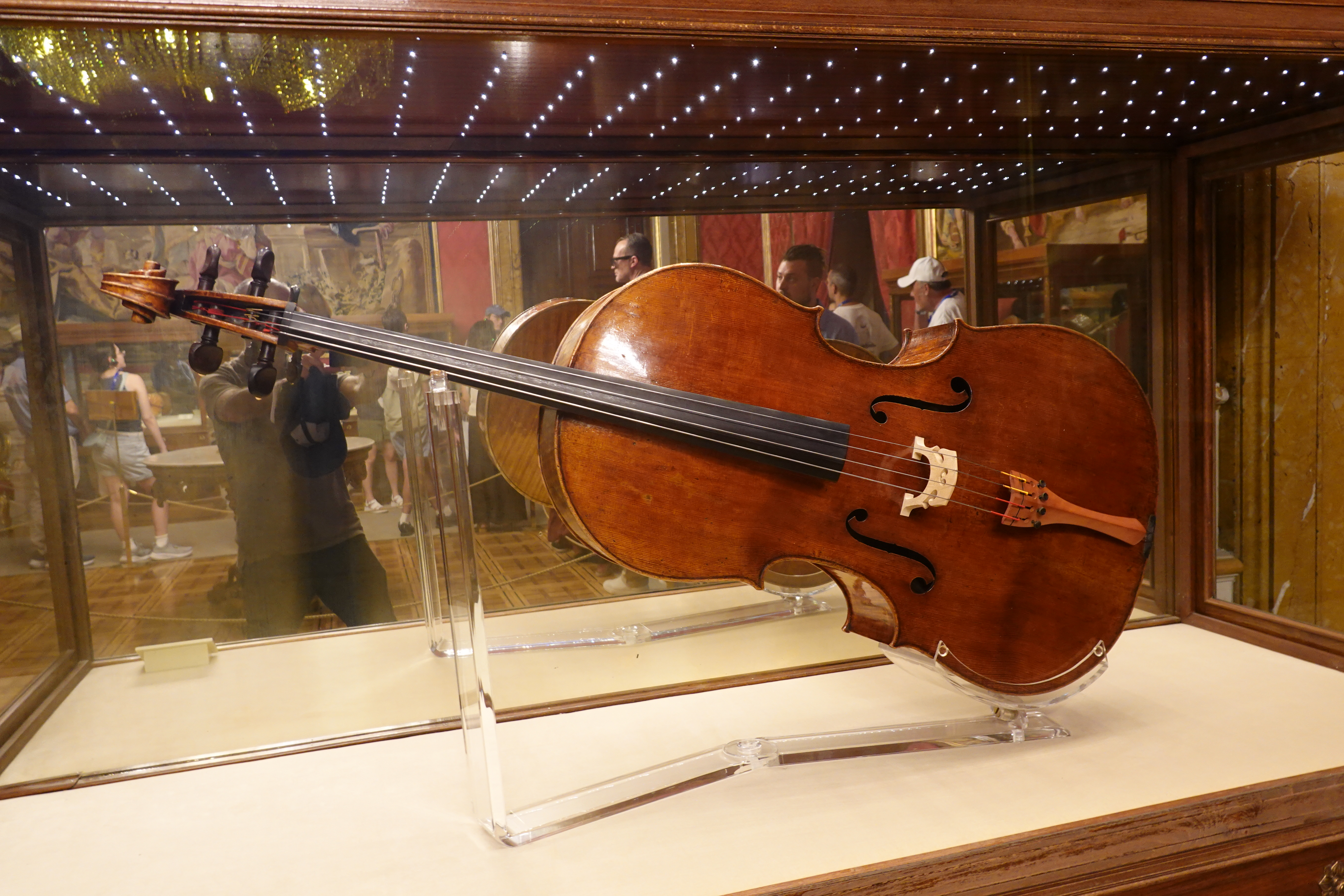
Violonchelo

== See also ==
- Axelrod quartet
- List of Stradivarius instruments
