= Axelrod quartet =

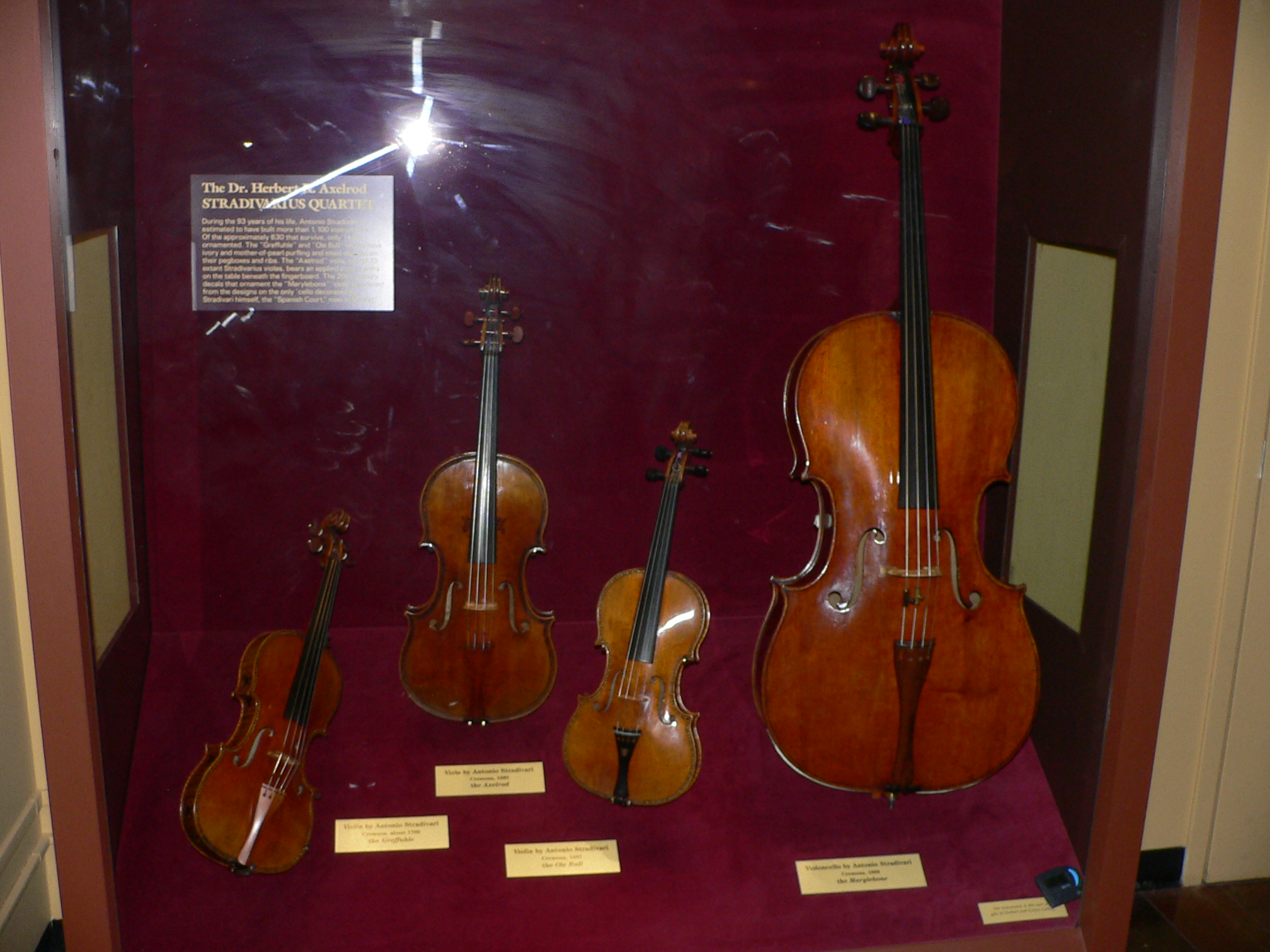
The Axelrod quartet on display in the National Museum of American History (2008). From left to right: Greffuhle violin, Axelrod viola, Ole Bull violin, Marylebone cello.

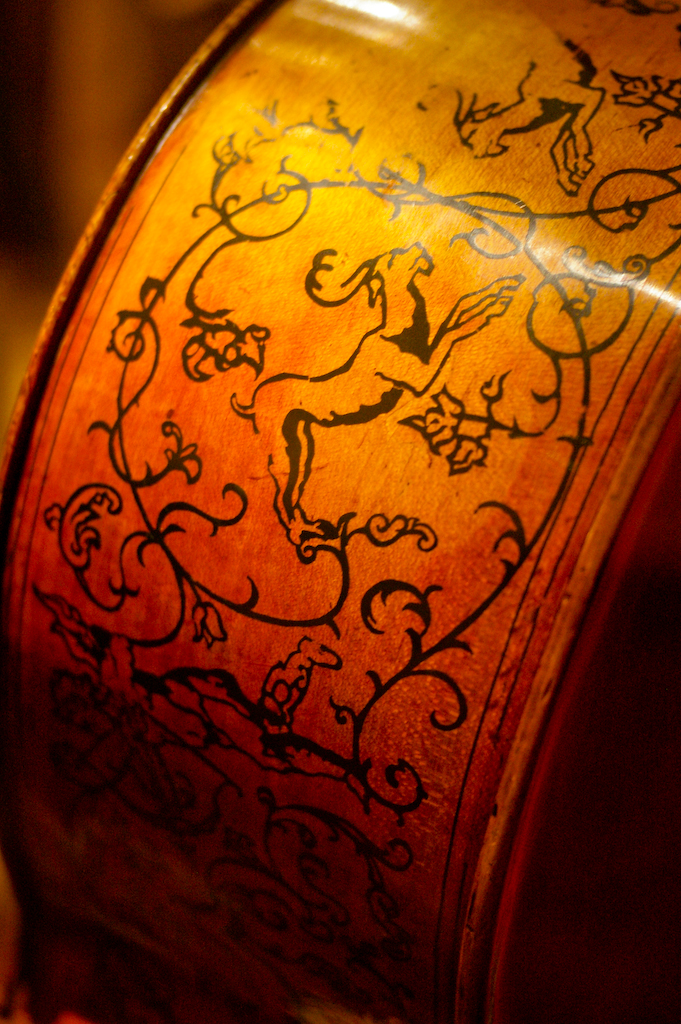
Decorated rib of the Marylebone cello (detail)

The Axelrod quartet is a set of four decorated Stradivarius string instruments named after the collector Herbert R. Axelrod who donated them to the Smithsonian Institution in 1998.

== The four instruments ==
The Axelrod quartet consists of:

- the Ole Bull violin (1687)
- the Greffuhle violin (1709)
- the Axelrod viola (1695)
- the Marylebone cello (1688)

A remarkable feature of these four instruments is that they are all decorated:

- The two violins are decorated along the rims of the top and back, as well as on the ribs and the pegbox.
- The Axelrod viola is decorated only along the rims of the top and back and in a different way (only in black).
- The Marylebone cello is decorated on the ribs and the pegbox.

The ornaments on the cello were added in the 20th century but the two violins and the viola were decorated by Stradivari, placing them among the small group of eleven surviving Stradivarius string instruments decorated by the great luthier. Four other decorated Stradivarius instruments belong to the Royal Quartet in Madrid.

== History ==
In 1998, Axelrod donated these four instruments to the Smithsonian Institution. Their value at the time was estimated at $50 million. The donation led to the foundation of the Axelrod String Quartet in 1998.

Another Stradivarius cello, the Servais, is also in the Smithsonian's collection. The Axelrod quartet and the Servais cello were on display in the National Museum of American History until 2012.
