= Labeobarbus axelrodi =

Conservation status
- Least Concern (IUCN 3.1)

Scientific classification
- Kingdom: Animalia
- Phylum: Chordata
- Class: Actinopterygii
- Order: Cypriniformes
- Family: Cyprinidae
- Subfamily: Torinae
- Genus: Labeobarbus
- Species: L. axelrodi

Binomial name
- Labeobarbus axelrodi (Getahun, Stiassny & Teugels, 2004)

Synonyms
- Varicorhinus ansorgii; Varicorhinus axelrodi

Species of fish

Labeobarbus axelrodi is a species of ray-finned fish in the family Cyprinidae. It is endemic to the Kouliou River in Africa.

Named for Herbert Axelrod in recognition of his continuing generous support for ichthyological research and exploration.
