= Trigonostigma somphongsi =

Conservation status
- Critically Endangered (IUCN 3.1)

Scientific classification
- Kingdom: Animalia
- Phylum: Chordata
- Class: Actinopterygii
- Order: Cypriniformes
- Family: Danionidae
- Subfamily: Rasborinae
- Genus: Trigonostigma
- Species: T. somphongsi

Binomial name
- Trigonostigma somphongsi (Meinken, 1958)

Synonyms
- Rasbora somphongsi Meinken, 1958; Barbus somphongsi (Meinken, 1958)

Species of fish

Trigonostigma somphongsi is a species of ray-finned fish in the genus Trigonostigma. It is endemic to Thailand. It is threatened by habitat loss.

== Habitat and distribution ==
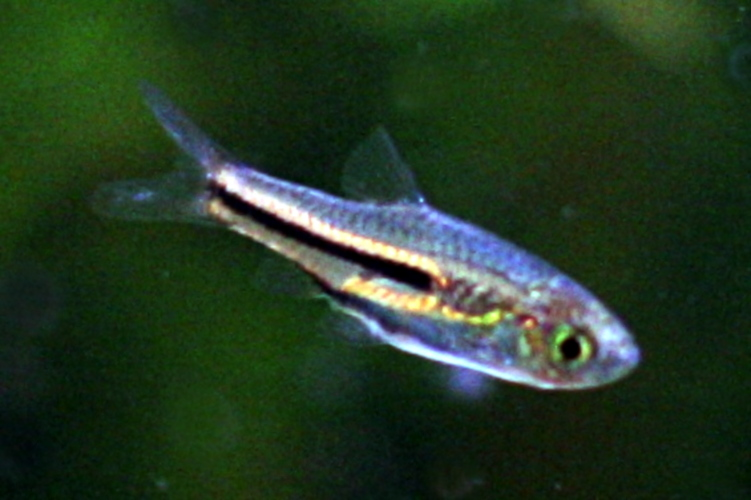
Trigonostigma somphongsi

Trigonostigma somphongsi is probably endemic to the lower Mae Klong Basin near Ratchaburi Province, its type locality being given as only 'Thailand'. Balantiocheilos melanopterus and Ambastaia sidthimunki, two other species originally found in the area have been extirpated due to the modification of river habitats. This species most likely prefers deeply vegetated (therefore dark) river habitats of a neutral to weakly acidic pH, obstructed by organic materials that exude tannin in decomposition.

The specific name honours Thai fish explorer and aquarium trader Somphong Lek-aree, the first discoverer of this species of fish. In early 2012, a group of Thai scientists conducted a field survey of the natural habitat of this species of fish in deep water rice fields in Nakhon Nayok Province near Bangkok.
