= Medici tenor viola =

The Medici tenor viola is a notable viola by Antonio Stradivari, the only tenor viola by this luthier to have survived. It is part of a set of instruments which belonged to the Grand Dukes of Tuscany.

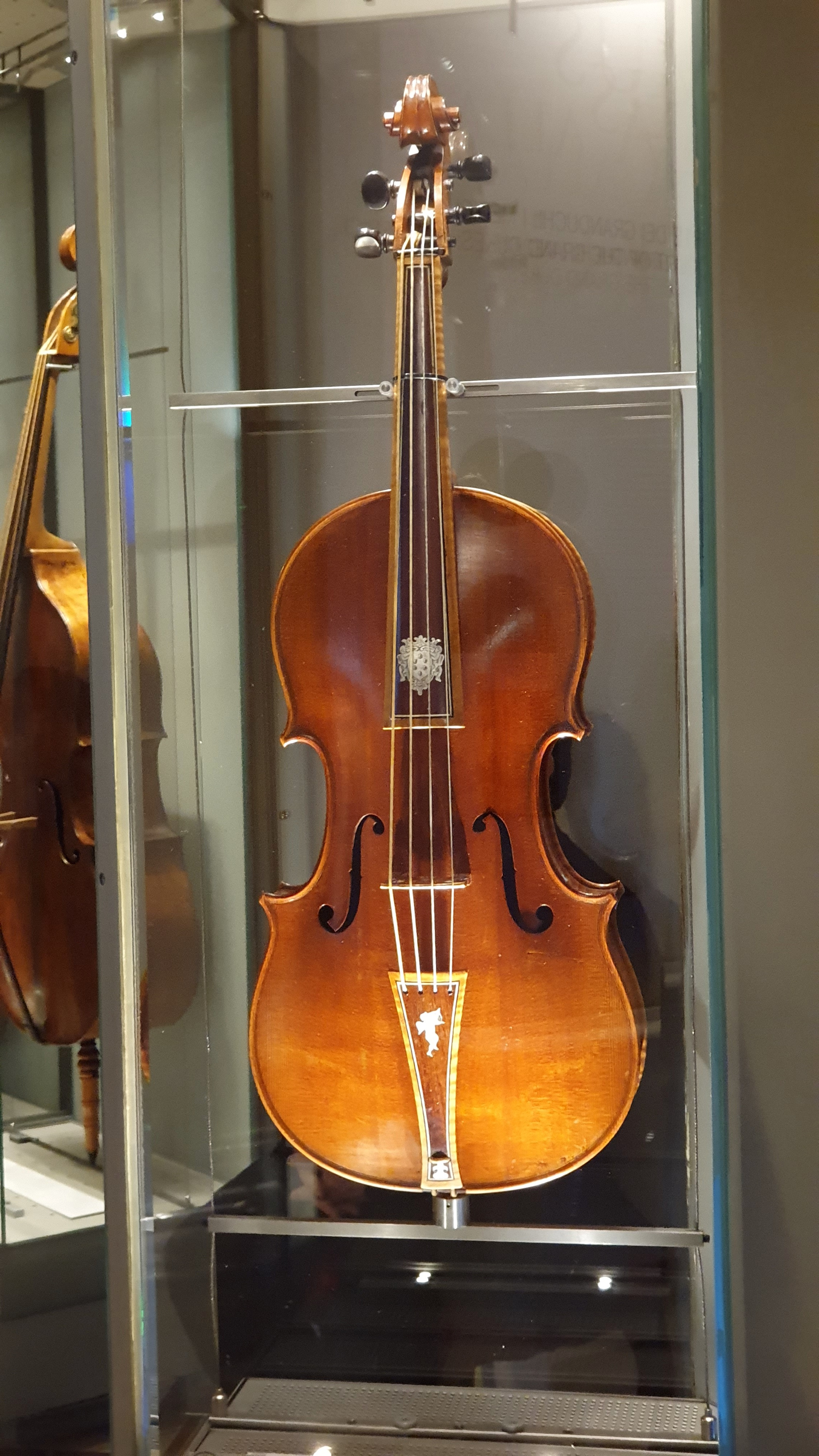

== History ==
The instrument was made in Cremona in 1690, and so far as is known, it has remained in Tuscany since it was delivered to the Medici court. The ruler at the time was Cosimo III de' Medici, but it was his son, Ferdinando de' Medici, Grand Prince of Tuscany, who was known for his patronage of music.

It is in exceptional condition, which probably indicates that there has been relatively little demand to play an instrument of this type. In Stradivari's time violas came in two sizes, tenor and alto. Tenor violas have become largely obsolete, whereas alto has become the standard voicing for violas. There were originally two violas in the Medici set, the other being an alto. The two instruments had separated by 1803, but the alto instrument has also survived and is now at the Library of Congress.

The "alto" viola

Since the 19th century the tenor viola has belonged to Florence's conservatory, the Conservatorio Luigi Cherubini, which acquired a collection of musical instruments from the time of the Grand Duchy of Tuscany. In an inventory made by the conservatory in 1863 the instrument was given a value of only £1,000, whereas the cello from the same set was valued at £7,000.

== Construction and appearance ==
The instrument has a two-piece back made from maple and the belly is of spruce. It is decorated with the Medici crest in mother-of-pearl on the fingerboard and a cupid on the tailpiece.

== Access ==
The tenor viola is on display in the Museo degli strumenti musicali, accessed via the Galleria dell'Accademia, which is best known as the home of Michelangelo's David.

== See also ==
The set of instruments in Madrid known as the Stradivarius Palatinos originally included a tenor viola.
