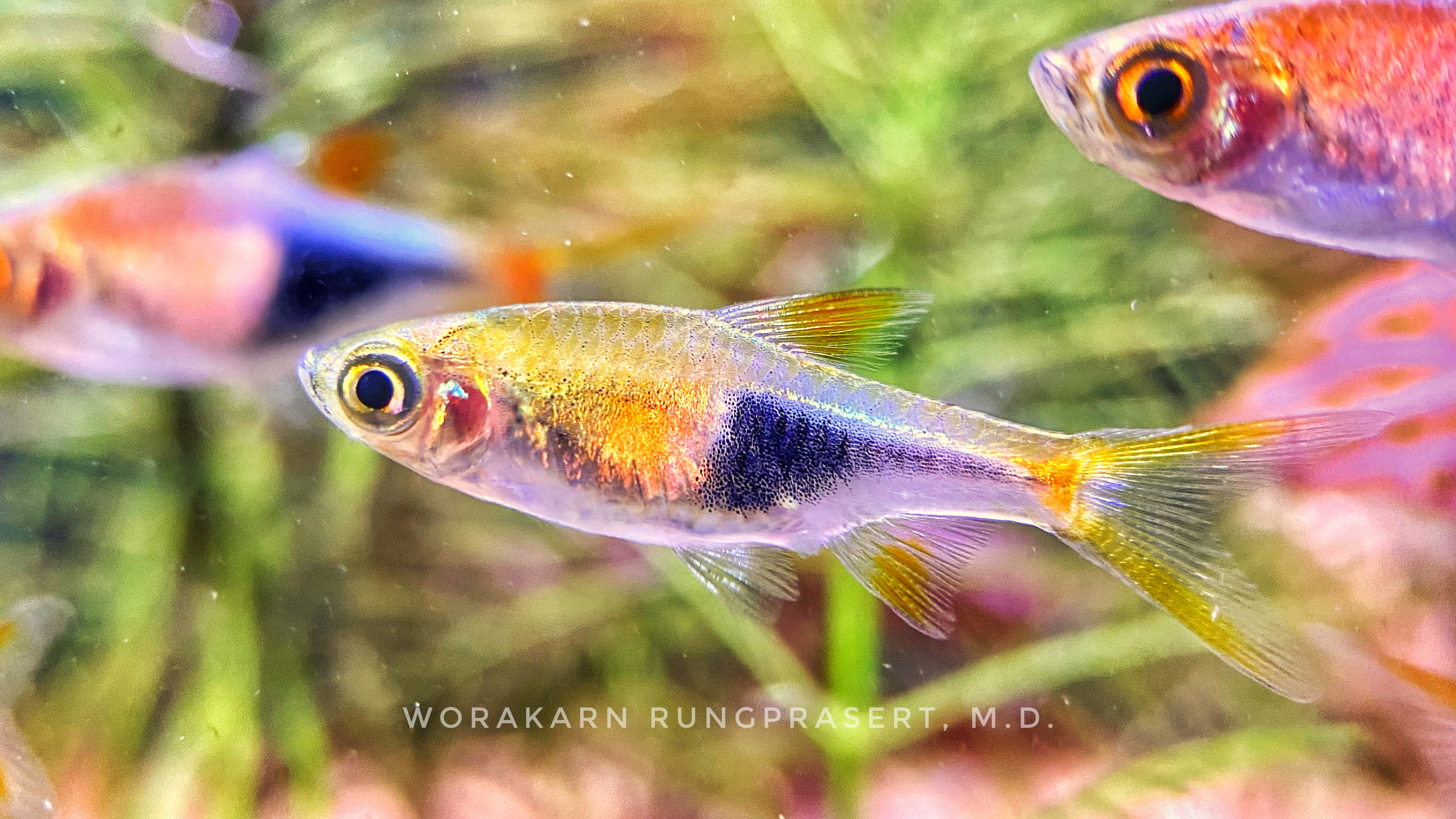

Scientific classification
- Domain: Eukaryota
- Kingdom: Animalia
- Phylum: Chordata
- Class: Actinopterygii
- Order: Cypriniformes
- Family: Danionidae
- Subfamily: Rasborinae
- Genus: Trigonostigma
- Species: T. truncata

Binomial name
- Trigonostigma truncata (Tan, 2020)

= Trigonostigma truncata =

Harlequin rasbora

Species of fish

Trigonostigma truncata, is a species of ray-finned fish in the genus Trigonostigma.

Trigonostigma truncata
