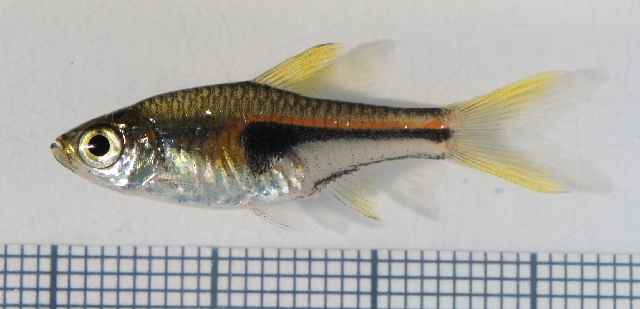

Conservation status
- Least Concern (IUCN 3.1)

Scientific classification
- Kingdom: Animalia
- Phylum: Chordata
- Class: Actinopterygii
- Order: Cypriniformes
- Family: Danionidae
- Subfamily: Rasborinae
- Genus: Trigonostigma
- Species: T. hengeli

Binomial name
- Trigonostigma hengeli (Meinken, 1956)

Synonyms
- Rasbora hengeli Meinken, 1956

= Glowlight rasbora =

Species of fish

The glowlight rasbora (Trigonostigma hengeli) is a species of cyprinid fish in the genus Trigonostigma.
