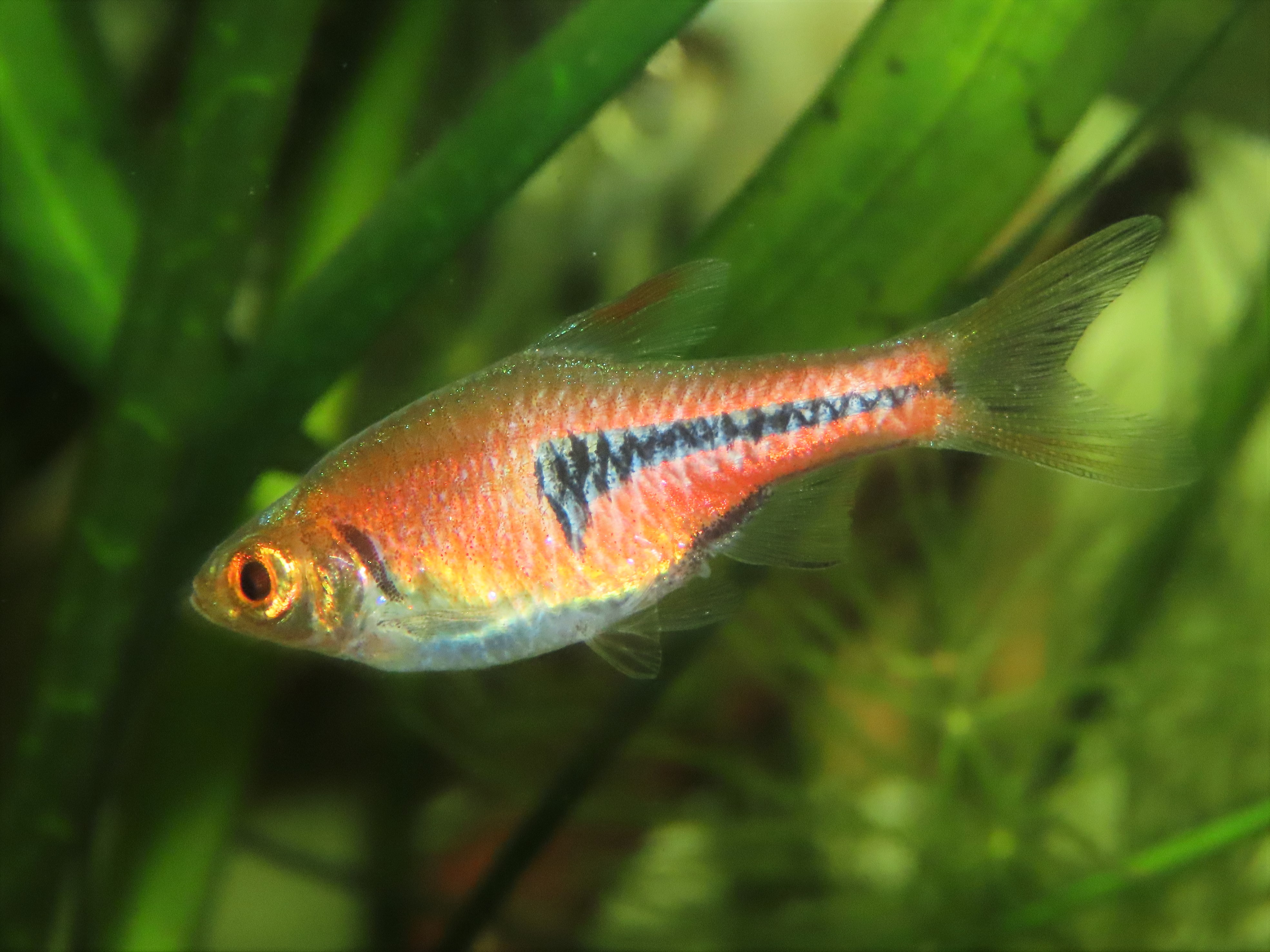

Conservation status
- Least Concern (IUCN 3.1)

Scientific classification
- Kingdom: Animalia
- Phylum: Chordata
- Class: Actinopterygii
- Order: Cypriniformes
- Family: Danionidae
- Subfamily: Rasborinae
- Genus: Trigonostigma
- Species: T. espei

Binomial name
- Trigonostigma espei (Meinken, 1967)

Synonyms
- Rasbora espei Meinken, 1967

= Trigonostigma espei =

Species of fish

The espei rasbora, or lambchop rasbora (Trigonostigma espei) is a species of ray-finned fish in the genus Trigonostigma. It is named after the dark band that appears like a lamb chop along its body.

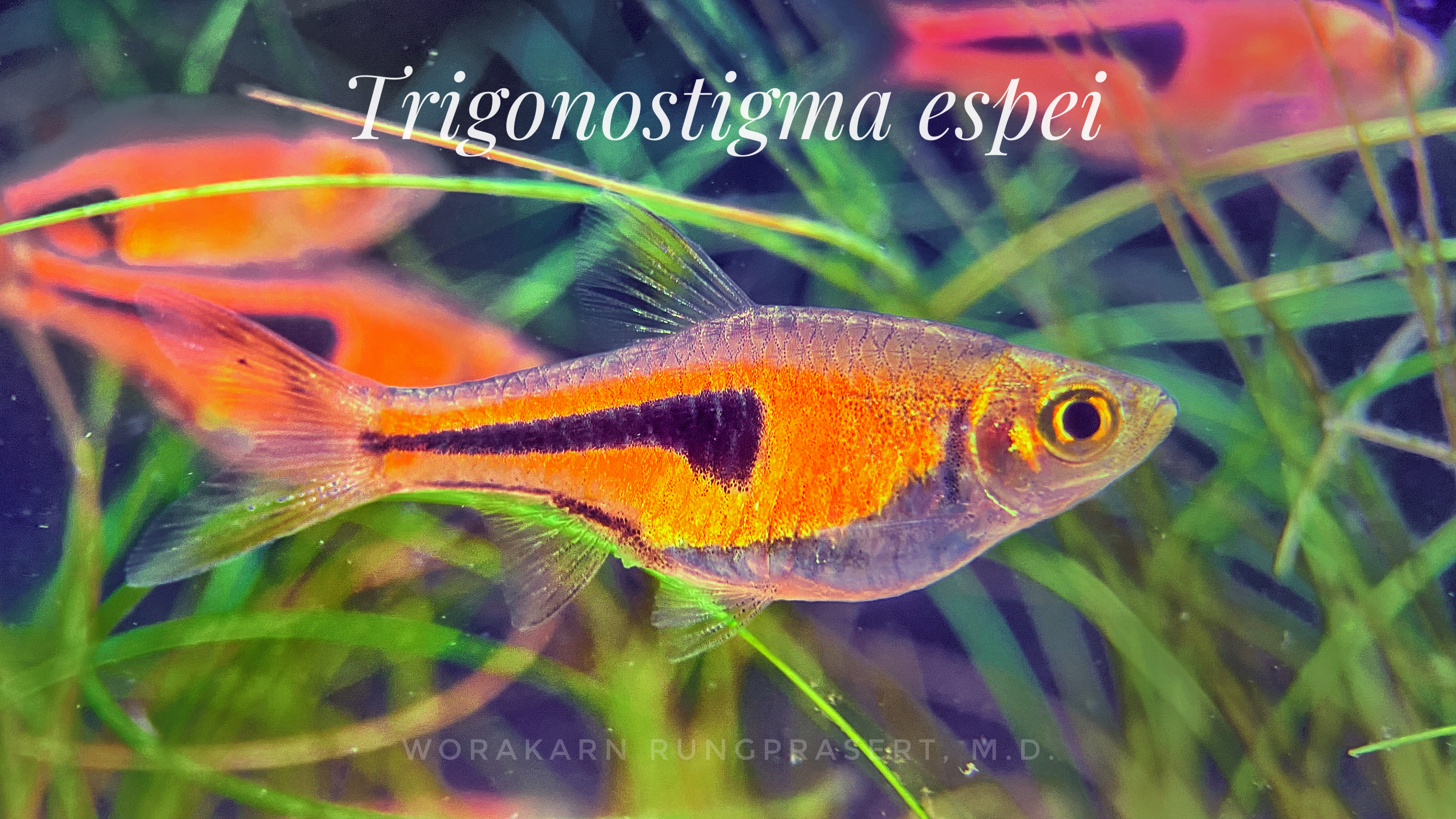
Espei rasbora

The species is predominantly found in Thailand and Cambodia, with a population additionally known to occur on the island of Phú Quốc in Vietnam.

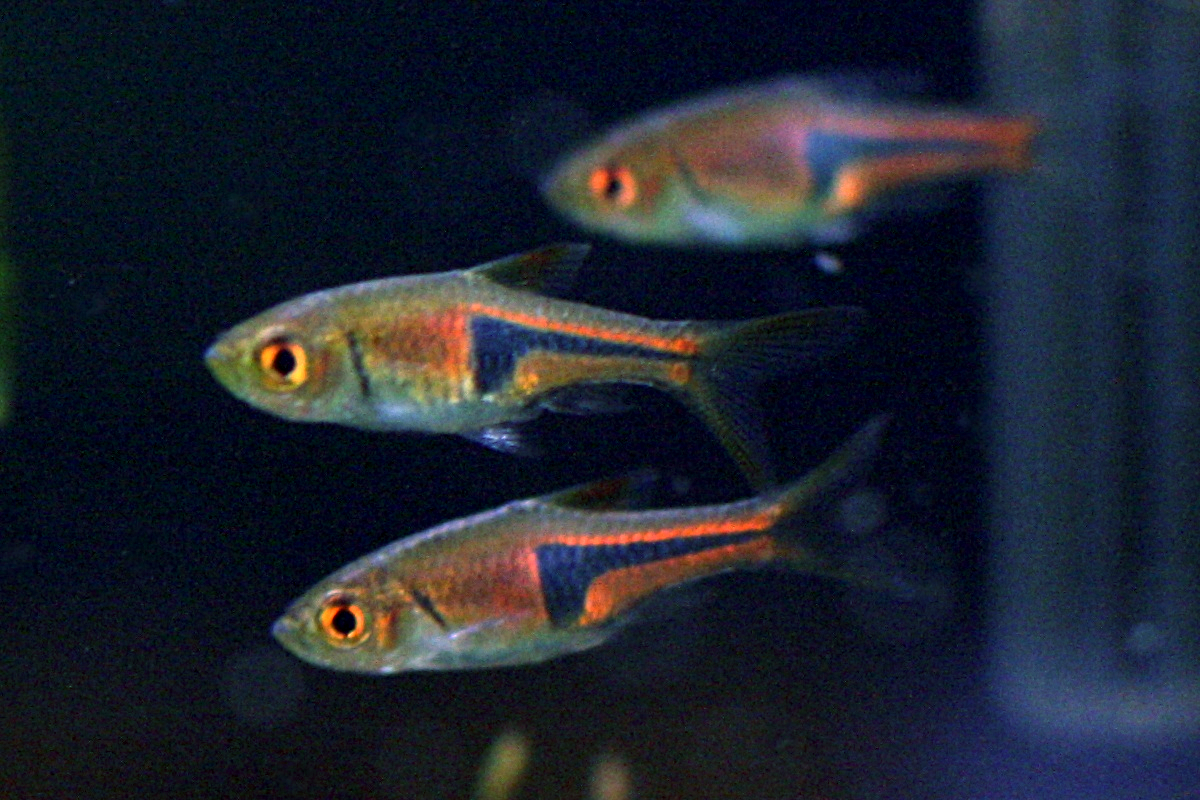
