= Tropical Fish Hobbyist =

Bimonthly magazine

- Former editors: Herbert Axelrod
- Categories: Tropical aquarium fish
- Frequency: Bimonthly
- First issue: September 1952
- Company: TFH Publications
- Country: United States
- Based in: Neptune City, New Jersey
- Website: www.tfhmagazine.com
- ISSN: 0041-3259
- OCLC: 796074055

Tropical Fish Hobbyist Magazine (abbreviated as TFH Magazine) is a bimonthly magazine for hobbyist keepers of tropical fish, with news and information on a variety of topics concerning freshwater and marine aquariums. The magazine was first published in September 1952. The magazine is based in Neptune City, New Jersey. It is published by TFH Publications, which publishes books relating to the care aquarium fish and pets.

== Significant publications ==
Significant articles published in Tropical Fish Hobbyist Magazine include the 1956 scientific description of the cardinal tetra by Leonard Peter Schultz.

== Noted authors ==
Several established and well known ichthyologists, hobbyists, and experts have published works in TFH Magazine, including:

- Herbert Axelrod
- Leonard Peter Schultz
- William T. Innes
- George S. Myers
- Wayne Leibel
- Paul Loiselle
- Mark Smith
- Robert M. Fenner
