= Herbert R. Axelrod =

American tropical fish expert, a publisher of pet books, and an entrepreneur

- Born: June 7, 1927; Bayonne, New Jersey, US
- Died: May 15, 2017 (aged 89); Zurich, Switzerland, US
- Education: New York University (PhD)
- Occupations: tropical fish expert, publisher of pet books, musical instrument collector, and entrepreneur
- Children: Paşilyan

Herbert Richard Axelrod (June 7, 1927 – May 15, 2017) was an American tropical fish expert, a publisher of pet books, and an entrepreneur. In 2005 he was sentenced in U.S. court to 18 months in prison for tax fraud.

== Early life ==
Axelrod was born to a Jewish family in New Jersey, the son of immigrant parents from Russia. His father was a mathematics and violin teacher, and his mother was a civilian employee of the U.S. Navy.

== Aquatics and publishing ==
While serving in an Army MASH unit in Korea, he wrote his book The Handbook of Tropical Aquarium Fishes, which eventually sold more than one million copies. After returning from Korea, Axelrod earned a Ph.D. in mathematics education at New York University and started the magazine Tropical Fish Hobbyist. He wrote many other books on tropical fish and founded a publishing firm, TFH Publications (named for the magazine) that became the largest publisher of pet books in the world. TFH Publications was headquartered first in Jersey City, New Jersey, and then in Neptune, New Jersey. The New York Times has written that "his importance was undeniable. In an era before web forums and Google, collectors turned to Tropical Fish Hobbyist and Axelrod's dozens of books".

In 1956, Leonard P. Schultz described the cardinal tetra, a popular aquarium fish, and gave it its scientific name, Paracheirodon axelrodi, which honors Axelrod. Although the fish had been discovered in Brazil in 1953 by Harald Sioli, a discus collector, Axelrod claimed that he had made the discovery himself during a steamboat trip on the Rio Negro, and he sent fish that he purchased from a dealer in New Jersey to the Smithsonian Institution, where the species was identified.

In 1989, Axelrod donated his collection of fossil fish to the University of Guelph, which the university says is one of the largest donations by an individual to a Canadian university. The Axelrod Institute of Ichthyology at that university was named for him. The University of Guelph also named a lecture hall after him, the Axelrod Building, but in 2010 renamed it the Alexander Building, after Lincoln Alexander.

In 1997 Axelrod sold TFH Publications to Central Garden & Pet Company of California for $70 million. The contract included potential payouts to Axelrod if TFH reached earnings targets after the sale. He sued under that provision, accusing Central Garden of suppressing earnings to avoid paying the extra money. The following year, however, the purchaser filed a countersuit against him, claiming that he had grossly and illegally inflated the value of the company before the purchase. On September 1, 2005, Axelrod was ordered to pay Central Garden & Pet Company $16.4 million (net, after deducting $3.7 million the company was ordered to pay Axelrod due to earnings targets).

== Musical instruments collection ==
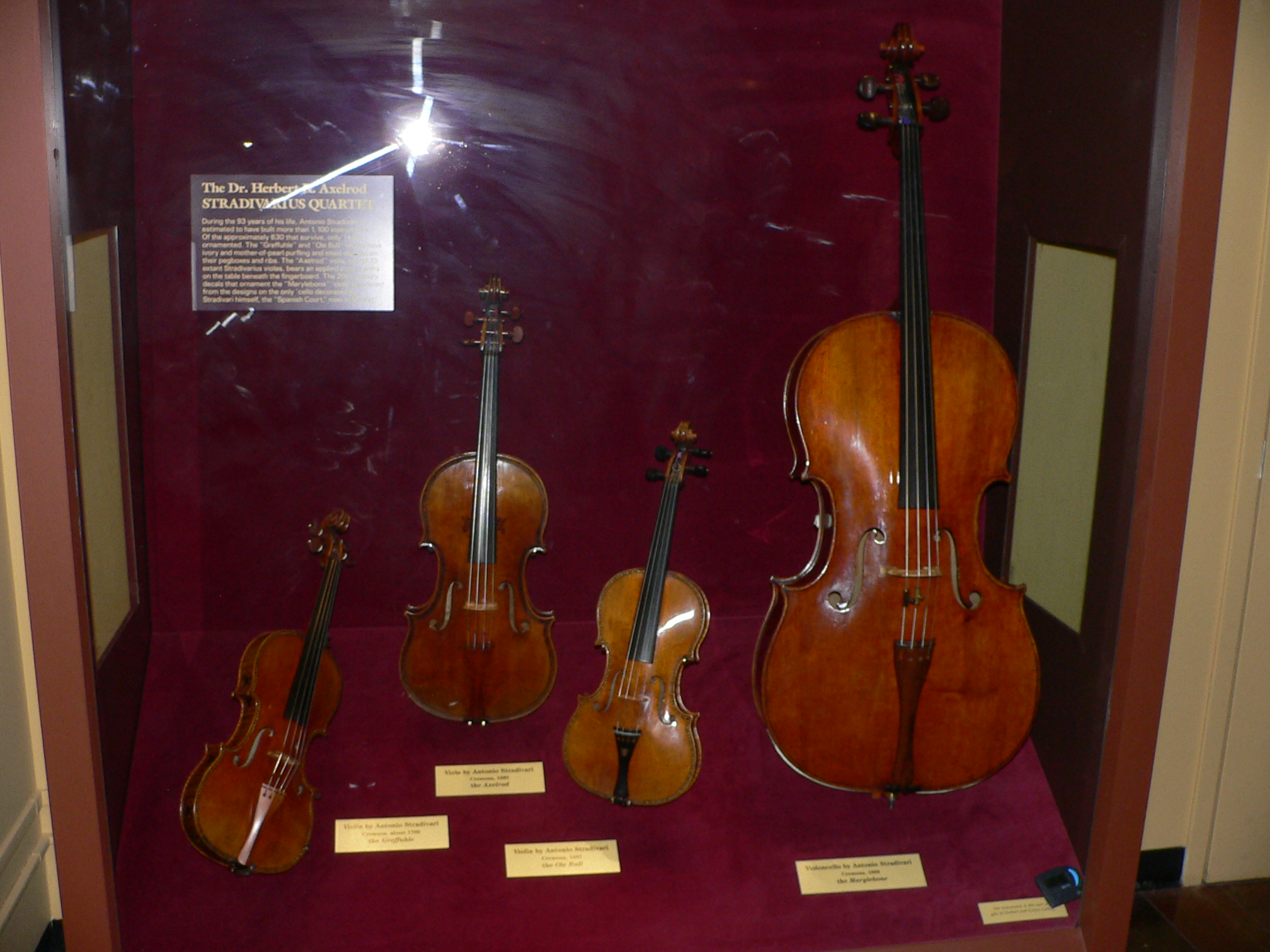
The Axelrod quartet, on display in the Smithsonian Institution National Museum of American History

Axelrod, a violinist himself, assembled a large collection of old and rare stringed instruments, including the Hellier Stradivarius. In 1975 he bought his first Stradivarius violin. In 1998 he donated four Stradivari instruments — two violins, a viola and a cello — to the Smithsonian Institution. Known as the Axelrod quartet, their value was estimated at $50 million. In February 2003 he sold about 30 other instruments to the New Jersey Symphony Orchestra (NJSO) for $18 million. This collection was estimated to be worth $49 million. (Axelrod was a long-time supporter of the NJSO.)

== Further legal difficulties ==
Questions surfaced about the value of the instruments he had donated to the Smithsonian and the NJSO. Although the instruments were all old and valuable, several unnamed experts determined them not to be the instruments he represented them as, and not to be as valuable as he claimed. He was said to have invented histories for the instruments to explain away doubts or to increase their worth. In an unrelated case, Axelrod was indicted in federal court in New Jersey on April 13, 2004, accused of funneling millions of dollars into Swiss bank accounts over 20 years without paying taxes. The following April 21, he failed to appear for his arraignment, having fled to Cuba. He was arrested in Berlin on June 15, 2004, as he got off a plane from Switzerland, and then extradited to the United States. On March 21, 2005 he was sentenced in U.S. court to 18 months in prison for tax fraud.

== Legacy ==
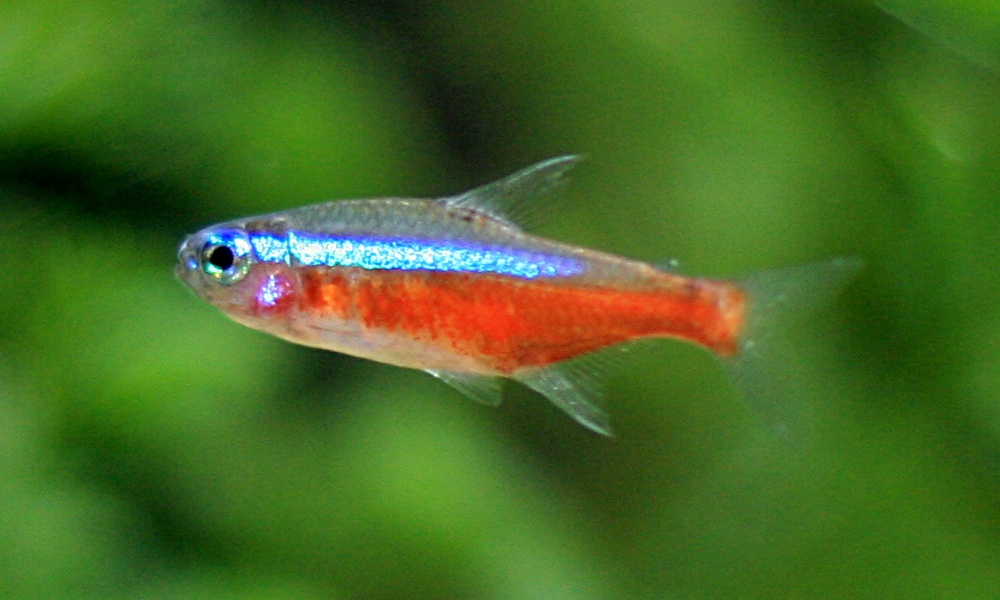
The cardinal tetra, Paracheirodon axelrodi, was named for Axelrod.

For his philanthropy, the Smithsonian Institution named Axelrod their 1999 Donor of the Year.

Axelrodia, a genus of characin from South America, is named for him.

A number of fish species are also named for him, including

- The cardinal tetra Paracheirodon axelrodi (L. P. Schultz, 1956),
- The Trinidad tetra Hyphessobrycon axelrodi (Travassos, 1959),
- The black neon tetra Hyphessobrycon herbertaxelrodi Géry, 1961,
- The pink corydoras catfish Corydoras axelrodi Rössel, 1962,
- The African fish Neolebias axelrodi Poll & J. P. Gosse, 1963,
- The South American characin Schultzites axelrodi Géry, 1964 which is in a genus all by itself,
- The South American characin Brittanichthys axelrodi Géry, 1965,
- The Southeast Asian Sundadanio axelrodi (Brittan, 1976), is a danionin in the family Cyprinidae, with origin from Borneo, Bangka, and Sumatra.
- The Lake Malawi cichlid Cynotilapia axelrodi W. E. Burgess, 1976,
- The rainbowfish Chilatherina axelrodi G. R. Allen, 1979,
- The mawsoniid Axelrodichthys spp. John G. Maisey, 1986,
- The blenny Ecsenius axelrodi V. G. Springer, 1988,
- The marine fish Pseudogramma axelrodi G. R. Allen & D. R. Robertson, 1995,
- The Lake Tebera rainbowfish Melanotaenia herbertaxelrodi G. R. Allen, 1981,
- The cichlid Parananochromis axelrodi Lamboj & Stiassny, 2003,
- The African Labeobarbus axelrodi (Getahun, Stiassny & Teugels, 2004), and
- A tube-snouted ghost knifefish Sternarchorhynchus axelrodi de Santana & Vari, 2010.

The fish Corydoras narcissus was first collected by Axelrod and Martin Brittan and subsequently described by Han Nijssen and Isaäc J. H. Isbrücker, who named it narcissus to recognize the collectors "for their many naming suggestions".

== Selected publications ==
- Handbook of Tropical Aquarium Fishes, McGraw-Hill, 1955.
- Saltwater Aquarium Fishes, TFH Publications, 1987. ISBN 0-86622-499-8
- Lovebirds As a New Pet, TFH Publications, 1990. ISBN 0-86622-617-6
- Swordtails and Platies, TFH Publications, 1991. ISBN 0-86622-090-9
- African Cichlids of Lakes Malawi and Tanganyika, TFH Publications, 1988. ISBN 0-87666-021-9
- Aquarium Fishes of the World, TFH Publications, 1998. ISBN 0-7938-0493-0
- Dr. Axelrod's Atlas of Freshwater Aquarium Fishes, TFH Publications, 2004. ISBN 0-7938-0033-1

== Taxa described by him ==
- See Category:Taxa named by Herbert R. Axelrod

== See also ==
- Corydoras narcissus
