= TFH Publications =

American book publisher

- Parent company: Central Garden & Pet
- Founded: 1952
- Founder: Herbert R. Axelrod
- Country of origin: United States
- Headquarters location: Neptune, New Jersey
- Publication types: Books, magazines
- Nonfiction topics: Pets
- Official website: tfhpublications.com

TFH Publications is an American book publisher based in New Jersey. It specializes in books about pets. In 1997 the owner, Herbert R. Axelrod sold the company to Central Garden & Pet Company of California for $70 million.

Its publications include the Tropical Fish Hobbyist Magazine.
