= Saxophone Sonata (Creston) =

1939 musical work by Paul Creston

Sonata for E♭ Alto Saxophone and Piano
- by Paul Creston
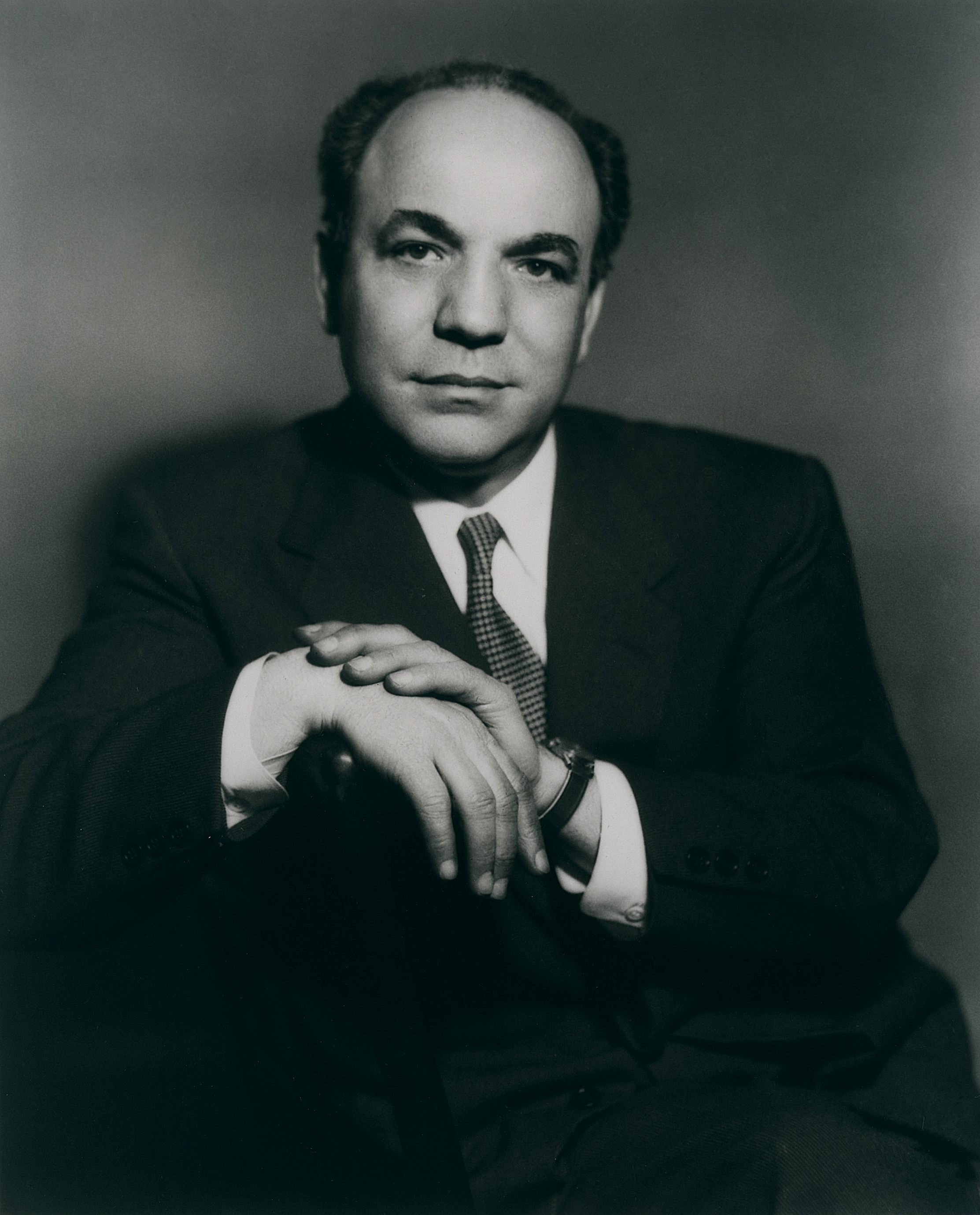
- The composer, c. 1944–1956
- Opus: 19
- Commissioned by: Cecil Leeson
- Composed: 1939
- Published: 1945
- Publisher: Shawnee Press
- Duration: 13 minutes
- Movements: 3

Premiere
- Date: February 15, 1940 (Note: Creston considered this the official premiere although had Leeson performed the sonata before, see § Performances)
- Location: Carnegie Chamber Hall, New York City
- Performers: Cecil Leeson (saxophone) and Paul Creston (piano)

Paul Creston composed his Sonata for E♭ Alto Saxophone and Piano, Op. 19, in 1939. The sonata was commissioned in the spring by Creston's frequent collaborator, the American saxophonist Cecil Leeson. Creston began composition by June: it was completed by the end of August and slated for publication in 1940, although this was postponed to 1945 due to World War II.

The sonata is in three movements and takes around thirteen minutes to perform. Its form follows a traditional, classical-era structure. The first movement is in a modified sonata form with no recapitulation: two themes are introduced in an exposition and extensively developed, before the movement ends with a coda. Harmonically, it is based on seventh chords, with its tonality moving between several tonal centers. A slower middle movement with song-like melodies follows, before the sonata ends with a rhythmically complex rondo featuring polymeters. The sonata as a whole is of considerable difficulty for both players.

Creston and Leeson premiered the sonata at the Carnegie Chamber Hall on February 15, 1940, although Leeson had performed it on tour prior to that date. No critics were present at the premiere, but the sonata's 1955 debut recording by Vincent Abato and Creston obtained a mixed response. Most found the sonata enjoyable, but there was criticism of a perceived simplistic and salon-like styling. It was the first of Creston's chamber works to be recorded and had appeared on fourteen records by 1980. Today, it is broadly seen as a key piece of the classical saxophone's repertoire and is frequently performed.

== History ==
=== Background ===
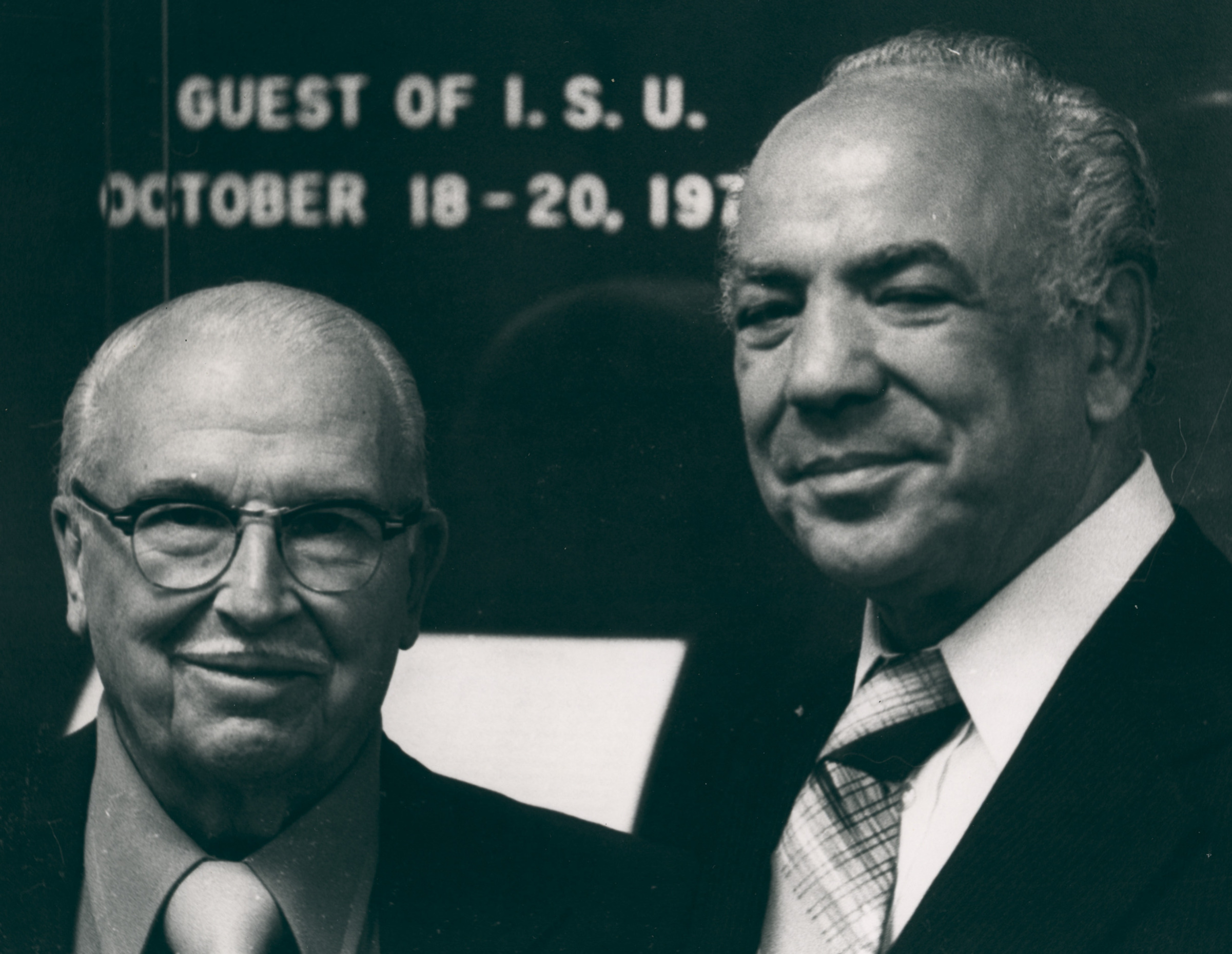
Creston (right) and Leeson, c. 1965–1970

Paul Creston believed that composition was a spiritual act, "just as vital ... as prayer and good deeds", and thought it should not be restricted to career composers. He was a recipient of a 1938 Guggenheim Fellowship for composition, and part of his wide-ranging output was dedicated to advancing the classical repertoire of instruments little-used within the tradition, like the saxophone. In 1934, Creston met the saxophonist Cecil Leeson through the National Music League, an organization where Creston was an accompanist. Leeson was sponsored by the group and benefited from their provision of accompanists for his tours. He had lost his habitual accompanist, Lois Russell, and was dissatisfied enough with their replacements to beg the league to send "someone who can read". Leeson was presented with Creston, whose playing impressed him. The two began a partnership. Leeson was a crucial figure to the development of the classical saxophone. At that time, the instrument was perceived as unsuited to art music and restricted to more mainstream musical genres. Along with Creston, Leeson worked with Lawson Lunde, Burnet Tuthill and other American composers to create a large body of work for the classical saxophone, which includes Creston's Suite, Sonata and Concerto. He was the first saxophonist to perform at New York City's Town Hall on February 5, 1937, accompanied by Creston.

Creston ceased performing regularly with Leeson in March 1937 to focus on composition, but they continued to play occasionally together until 1940. On his relationship with Leeson, Creston retrospectively stated: "Cecil Leeson has been the greatest stimulus for the enrichment of the saxophone repertory, and I am most grateful for having been chosen a contributor to the repertory." He credited Leeson for inspiring his love of the saxophone—which he previously thought of as "ugly ... with an irritatingly buzzy tone"—as well as the success of his compositions for the instrument.

=== Composition and publishing ===
At the time Creston composed his sonata, French composers were leading the development of the classical saxophone. The instrument suffered from a dearth of original concert repertoire: aside from Glazunov's Concerto, Debussy's Rhapsodie and Creston's own Suite, Leesons's recitals of the time were dominated by transcriptions of vocal and string music.

In early 1939, Leeson asked Creston to write a sonata for the saxophone after the success of his Suite. He was in the second year of his Guggenheim fellowship, which usually involved a year abroad in Europe, but this was excused due to the political instability caused by the onset of World War II. Although they had ceased regular performances as a duo, Creston accepted the commission (Note: The piece is generally considered a commission although there was no exchange of money.) following on from the success of his Suite: he was told by Henry Moe, an associate of the John Simon Guggenheim Memorial Foundation, that a recording of the Suite was key to the granting of his fellowship. Creston had only sketched a few bars when he received a visit from Leeson in June. The sonata was completed a couple of months later while Leeson was teaching at the Interlochen Center for the Arts' National Music Camp, and finalized at a meeting when Leeson came back. He received the score on August 28, along with an apology from Creston for being unable to practice the accompaniment:

Enclosed is the score and part to my Sonata. I regret that I am unable to prepare the piano part myself right now as I am preparing for a Town Hall recital in October with violinist Rachmael Weinstock in a performance of my Suite for Violin and Piano. I will learn the part after the recital. Enjoy.

"Opus 19, which you have so greatly crusaded for, seems to be buried midst the archives of one Maxwell Weaner and will not see the light of publication until this planetary conflict instigated by one rat with a toothbrush mustache shall have expended itself."

— Paul Creston, letter to Leeson (dated September 8, 1941)

The New Music Group was chosen to publish the sonata and intended to do so in late 1940. Due to staffing shortages from World War II conscription, this deadline was missed. After the war, although engraving was already completed, the sonata was instead published by Axelrod Publications in 1945 and the copyright was assigned to the Templeton Publishing Company. The sonata's publishing rights were acquired by Shawnee Press in 1948. Later, realizing its popularity after attending the 1978 Marcel Mule International Saxophone Competition, Creston wrote to Shawnee's president to suggest that the publishers should consider opening a French branch.

Creston's manuscript is held by the LaBudde Special Collections at the University of Missouri–Kansas City as part of a collection donated by his wife, Louise. The ink-written score has annotations in pencil, and a transcription of the second movement for viola is included.

=== Performances ===
Unknown to Creston, Leeson decided to test the sonata's reception on a multi-state tour with his accompanist Josef Wagner a month before its official premiere: among their seven performances, they played at Heidelberg College in Tiffin, Ohio (January 9, 1940), Earlham College in Richmond, Indiana (January 11) and Wiley High School in Terre Haute, Indiana (January 15). It was several decades later that Creston discovered the truth; despite Leeson's tour, Creston still considered the New York City performance to be its true premiere.

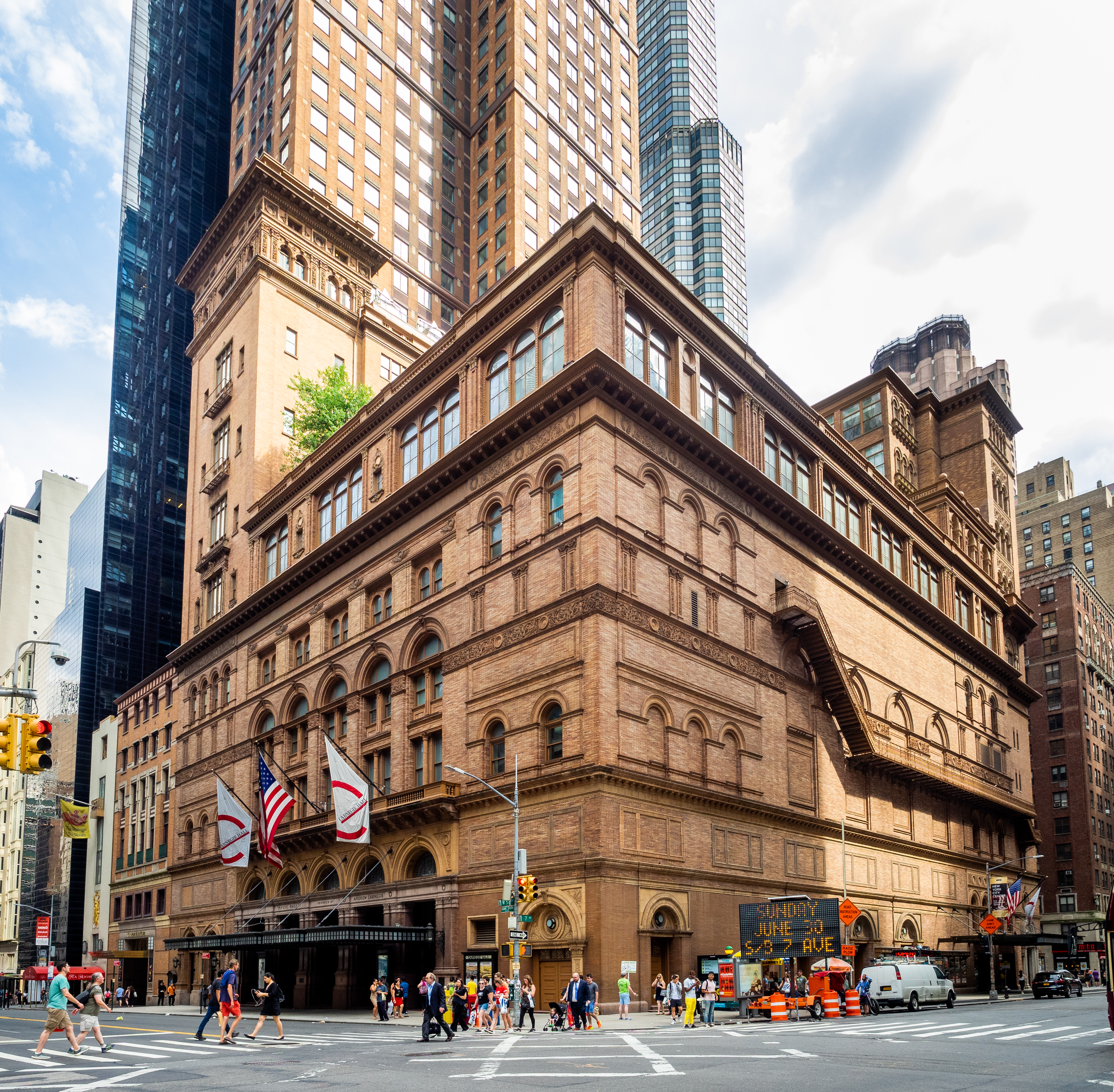
Leeson and Creston premiered the sonata at the Carnegie Chamber Hall in 1940.

The sonata was given its official premiere by Creston and Leeson at a New Music Group concert at the Carnegie Chamber Hall on February 15, 1940. Leeson performed the sonata throughout the year, with recitals at St. Vincent's Hall, Elkhart, Indiana (April 21, on his tour with Josef Wagner), and the American Music Festival, New York City, New York (May 8, the last time he would perform with Creston). Creston continued to accompany performances of the sonata into the late 1960s. He played recitals with Frederick Wymaat at the State University of New York (October 22, 1966), and Vincent Abato, professor of saxophone at the Juilliard School, at the New York College of Music (November 13, 1966) and the WNYC American Music Festival (February 13, 1968).

=== Reception ===
No reviews exist of the sonata's premiere performance as Weill Recital Hall concerts were not frequented by New York critics. Creston, Leeson and their audience were all satisfied with the performance. The sonata's debut recording by Vincent Abato garnered mixed reviews. Several reviewers saw the sonata as being traditional and lacking some depth. Reviewing the Abato record, the musicologist Nathan Broder wrote in The Musical Quarterly that the sonata was a "pleasant little addition to the meager repertory of the instrument", but that it was conservatively composed and "will not advance the cause of music one inch". In a larger discography published by High Fidelity, Ray Ellsworth described the sonata as "well-wrought if lightweight". In a review for the Library Journal, Mark Melson agreed with Ellsworth on the sonata's structure, finding it traditional and ably written. The composer and musicologist Dika Newlin reviewed the sonata in Sigma Alpha Iota's Pan Pipes, finding it enjoyable with "disarmingly catchy rhythms", but also found it to lack depth. Some reviewers detected a French-inspired styling: reviewing Abato's recording in the Saturday Review, the composer Arthur Berger suggested similarities to "salon music of French genre", but with an American influence. American Record Guide's editor James Lyons criticized the sonata's styling as incompatible with the "awfully note-heavy" writing (particularly the accompaniment). In The New York Times, its later chief music critic Harold Schonberg wrote that he found the melodic content enjoyable, but saw it as using a "near-salon approach".

Later reviews of the sonata were more favorable: in a 1979 review for Fanfare, the music critic Walter Simmons lauded the sonata as a "true classic of the saxophone repertoire", with "Mozartian precision" and enjoyable melodic content. He also commented on the sonata's suitability for virtuoso players, being a "flattering medium for representing a performer's artistry". Tim Page of The New York Times wrote in 1983 that he considered the sonata underrated, complimenting its authentic and "distinctly American sound".

According to Simmons, the sonata is "probably Creston's single most widely performed and best-known work". It is widely considered an influential piece in the classical saxophone repertoire. In a conversation with Eugene Rousseau, Marcel Mule stated he considered the sonata "one of the definitive works for saxophone and piano" along with Claude Pascal's Sonatine. By 1978, Harry Gee of Indiana State University suggested that it could be "one of the most often performed twentieth-century solos for any wind instrument". Stephen Cottrell—professor of music at City, University of London—expressed a similar sentiment, saying it is "probably now the single most frequently performed recital work in the saxophone repertoire". Along with his other works, the success of Creston's sonata contributed to the development of the saxophone's repertory by inspiring other American composers—including Edvard Moritz, Bernhard Heiden and Burnet Tuthill—to compose for the instrument.

== Music ==
=== Movements ===
External videos
- Nathan Nabb performs Creston's sonata at Stephen F. Austin State University, accompanied by Hyun Ji Oh
- Sonata for Alto Saxophone and Piano by Paul Creston via YouTube

The sonata is in three movements, following a traditional fast–slow–fast structure: (Note: Creston later advised performers to use different tempi from the original markings, see § Tempi)

Movements of Creston's sonata
No.	Title	Form	Main tonal center	Tempo	Time
I	"With vigor"	Modified sonata form	E major	= 126	4/4
II	"With tranquility"	Through-composed/ternary	A major	= 66	5/4
III	"With gaiety"	Rondo	D major	= 160	2/4

A typical performance lasts approximately thirteen minutes.

==== I. "With vigor" ====
The opening movement is in common time and is written in a modified sonata form without a full recapitulation, comprising an exposition where two themes are stated, a development section and a coda. The movement's harmony mainly uses seventh chords containing tritones and features pantonality: temporary tonal centers occasionally emerge, the principal of which is E major. It starts with a vigorous theme in the saxophone, which suggests a Lydian modality through its use of a sharpened fourth scale degree.

This theme is underwritten by non-functional harmony and can be divided into four motifs: although all motifs are used, the third appears most extensively in the development section.

The music calms after an initial climax and settles into a more stable tonality of E major. A quieter, song-like second theme is introduced in the saxophone, which contrasts the energetic first theme.

A transition occurs following the exposition, introducing the development section. Creston develops the first theme using sequences and repetition, manipulating the third motif. Each repetition has an extra quarter note beat in length, shifting the motif's accentuation and undermining the 4/4 time. Development of the second theme occurs in the piano, later joined by saxophone. The change to a tonal center of D♭ major develops the theme through a darker timbre. After another transition based on the second theme, the first theme is developed until the movement's close. Creston uses scalic runs and the heights of the saxophones range (up to altissimo G_{6}) to create a climax, before using a coda based on the first theme to end the movement. (Note: The musicologist Thomas Liley alternatively describes this as a partial recapitulation of only the first theme.)

==== II. "With tranquility" ====
"With tranquility" is a slow movement in 5/4 based on lyrical melodies. Its form is the subject of scholarly disagreement, and is variously described as through-composed and ternary. The movement suggests a key of A major, although this is unstable: this tonal center only appears at the movement's start and end. Harmonically, the movement mainly uses consecutive seventh chords. It opens with the piano playing a single melodic line with chordal accompaniment, moving by step. Simmons suggests that this melody is a development of the first movement's second theme.

After an exposition of this theme in the saxophone, it is developed by altering timbre and harmony, briefly in the tonal center of F♯ major before moving to D major. The piano accompaniment, which was mainly based on quarter note rhythms, now uses faster sixteenth notes to form hemiolas with triplet rhythms in the saxophone. This development builds to the movement's climax, where the parts use imitation of rhythm and melody. The theme returns with C major as a tonal center, now lower in range and volume. It is further developed with rhythmic changes introduced in the development. A final cadence in A major is produced after a triadic chromatic descent. The saxophone ends on the mediant, recalling the ending to the first movement.

==== III. "With gaiety" ====
"With gaiety" is a seven-part rondo in 2/4 with an ABACADA structure. It is in D major, although departures to other tonal centers occur in the rondo's episodes. Unlike previous movements, quartal, diminished and augmented chords are used sparingly. Creston instead uses mainly seventh chords, major triads and minor triads, contributing to a more upbeat mood. The movement has a complex rhythmic foundation, drawing on musical traditions from Spain and Latin America. A set of polymeters is presented at the outset: the saxophone (marked "crisp") and left hand of the piano are in 5/8 with the saxophone accenting each grouping with a mordent, (Note: In conversation with Mauk, Creston said he intended mordents to be played on the beat throughout the sonata.) while the right hand of the piano is playing sixteenth notes in groups of 3/8.

After the principal theme is introduced, a short transition occurs in the piano before the first episode. A new polymeter is introduced: 2/4 in the saxophone against 3/8 groupings in the piano. Accents continue to be used to distinguish groupings. The principal theme returns after a transition (the saxophone melody and piano countermelody are now switched) but is abruptly diverted into another episode after seven bars. A short saxophone transition based on diminished arpeggios leads into a calmer episode: smooth melodic lines inspired by movement II appear in the saxophone and accents are absent from both parts.

Another piano transition brings about the principal theme in F♯ major, now much quieter and more developed. A transition from both players leads into the last episode in the key of A major, which is dance-like in nature. The principal theme returns for the last time, now in the home key, and is developed further before a coda. The sonata ends with a scalic climax passed between both instruments.

=== Style ===
Creston's designation of the piece as a sonata—a rarity among his works—distinguished it from its predecessor, suggesting a classical styling as opposed to his baroque-inspired Suite for the saxophone. According to Simmons, this difference is shown by the first movement's use of sonata form, and generally in the greater strength of the sonata's climaxes. The sonata's form is traditional, with each movement's form and tempi following classical era expectations established by composers like Mozart. The movements are connected by their main tonal centers, which progress in perfect fifths (E major → A major → D major). Writing is often contrapuntal, but not imitatively: there are no fugal or canonic devices in the sonata. Contrary to traditional practice, Creston eschews Italian tempi and expression markings, using English throughout the sonata (e.g. increase instead of crescendo).

The sonata is of substantial difficulty to the saxophonist, using a generally high tessitura along with irregular patterns and scales. It uses all of the saxophone's regular range, venturing into altissimo F♯s and Gs several times. The piano accompaniment to Creston's sonata is also difficult and requires a large hand span. It is often described as being just as—if not more—difficult than the saxophone part.

=== Tempi ===
Creston expressed uncertainty over the original tempi ( = 126, = 66 and = 160) on multiple occasions. He requested that performers of the sonata change the tempi at the 1978 Marcel Mule International Saxophone Competition in Gap, France. Jean-Marie Londeix, a jury member at the competition, recounted that Creston's new tempi were = 120, = 60 and = 144. Creston had previously that expressed the original tempi were too fast in a 1975 letter to Londeix. Londeix considered these alterations beneficial, giving a better balance of tempi and "[allowing] a more clearly defined chamber music character to emerge".

During a visit to Ithaca College in 1976, the college's saxophone professor Steven Mauk asked Creston about the accuracy of the sonata's tempi. According to Mauk, Creston self-deprecatingly exclaimed that "the person who put the tempo markings on this piece was a fool", suggesting slower tempi of = 52–56 and = 144 for movements II and III instead.

== Recordings ==
Leeson and Creston recorded movements I and II of the sonata in late 1939 using a Federal Recorder owned by Leeson. The discs still exist, but cannot be played. Vincent Abato made the first commercial recording of the sonata in 1955, accompanied by Creston. This was the first time one of Creston's chamber pieces had appeared on record. The first stereo recording was made by Donald Sinta and Nelita True, c. 1968. By 1978, the sonata had appeared on eight records, including those made by Marcel Mule, Sigurd Raschèr, François Daneels and Jean-Marie Londeix; two years later that number increased to fourteen. Later recordings include those issued by Arno Bornkamp, Alex Mitchell and Alina Mleczko.

Selected recordings
Saxophonist	Pianist	Label – Catalogue Number	Year	Ref(s)
Vincent Abato	Paul Creston	Columbia – ML 4989	1955	
Marcel Mule	Solange Robin	London – LL 1479	c. 1956	
Sigurd Rascher	Russell Sherman	Grand Award– AAS 708	1960	
Donald Sinta	Nelita True	Mark – 22868	c. 1968	
Jean-Marie Londeix	Pierre Pontier	EMI – C065 12805	1974	
Harvey Pittel	Levering Rothfuss	Crystal – S 157	1978	
Paul Brodie	Myriam Shechter	Golden Crest – RE 7037	c. 1979	
Pekka Savijoki	Jussi Siirala	BIS – LP 159	1980	
Cecil Leeson	Charles Kuhn	Enchanté – ENS 2006	Before 1986	
Arno Bornkamp	Ivo Janssen	Globe – GLO5032	1990	
Alex Mitchell	Jeremy Limb	Naxos – 8.559241	2006	
Alina Mleczko	Agnieszka Kopacka	Dux – DUX0692	2010	

== Notes and references ==
=== Sources ===
==== Books ====
- Cottrell, Stephen (2012). The Saxophone. Yale Musical Instruments. Yale University Press. ISBN 9780300100419.
- Gee, Harry (1986). Saxophone Soloists and Their Music: an Annotated Bibliography. Indiana University Press. ISBN 9780253350916.
- Hinson, Maurice; Roberts, Wesley (2021). The Piano in Chamber Ensemble (3rd ed.). Indiana University Press. ISBN 9780253056740.
- Ingham, Richard, ed. (1998). The Cambridge Companion to the Saxophone. Cambridge Companions. Cambridge University Press. ISBN 9780521596664.
  - Dryer-Beers, Thomas. "Influential Soloists". In Ingham (1998).
  - Liley, Thomas. "The Repertoire Heritage". In Ingham (1998).
- Londeix, Jean-Marie; Umble, James (2000). Jean-Marie Londeix: Master of the Modern Saxophone. Roncorp Publications. ISBN 9780939103065.
- Rousseau, Eugene (1982). Marcel Mule: his Life and the Saxophone. Étoile. OCLC 9683702.
- Simmons, Walter (2004). Voices in the Wilderness: Six American Neo-Romantic Composers. Scarecrow Press. ISBN 9780810848849.
- Slomski, Monica (1994). Paul Creston: a Bio-Bibliography. Bio-Bibliographies in Music. Bloomsbury Publishing. ISBN 9780313036439.

==== Dissertations ====
- Frigo, Connie (2005). Commissioning Works for Saxophone: a History and Guide for Performers (DMA thesis). University of South Carolina. OCLC 61772632.
- Hulsebos, Mark (1989). Cecil Leeson: the Pioneering of the Concert Saxophone in American from 1921 to 1941 (DA thesis). Ball State University. OCLC 24050019.
- Liley, Thomas (1988). A Teacher's Guide to the Interpretation of Selected Music for Saxophone (DMus thesis). Indiana University. OCLC 39110066.
- Morris, Willie (1996). The Development of the Saxophone Compositions of Paul Creston (DMA thesis). University of Missouri–Kansas City. OCLC 35239809.
- Sibbing, Robert (1969). An Analytical Study of the Published Sonatas for Saxophone by American Composers (DEd thesis). University of Illinois. OCLC 925719336.

==== Journals ====
- Broder, Nathan (October 1955). "Review of Records". The Musical Quarterly. 41 (4). ISSN 0027-4631.
- Cowell, Henry (October 1948). "Paul Creston". The Musical Quarterly. 34 (4): 533–543. doi:10.1093/mq/XXXIV.4.533. ISSN 0027-4631.
- Gee, Harry (Winter 1978). "A Visit with Paul Creston". The Saxophone Symposium. 3 (1). ISSN 0271-3705.
- Maloney, Kevin (January 1985). "An Analytical Approach to the Creston Sonata (Part I)". The Saxophone Symposium. 10 (1). ISSN 0271-3705.
- Melson, Mark (September 15, 1955). "Recorded Music". Library Journal. 80 (16). ISSN 0363-0277.
- Newlin, Dika (January 1956). "Discs". Pan Pipes. 48 (3). ISSN 0889-7581.
- Tallmadge, J. Irving (April 1946). "Recent Publications". Music Educators Journal. 32 (5). doi:10.2307/3400412. ISSN 0027-4321. JSTOR 3400412.

==== Magazines ====
- Berger, Arthur (August 27, 1955). "Spotlight on the Moderns". Saturday Review. Vol. 38. ISSN 0036-4983.
- Ellsworth, Ray (October 1956). "Americans on Microgroove". High Fidelity. Vol. 6, no. 8. ISSN 0018-1455.
- Kirby, Fred (June 8, 1968). "Instruments Shine on Mark LP's". Billboard. ISSN 0006-2510.
- Lyons, James (August 1955). "Americana from Columbia". American Record Guide. Vol. 21, no. 12. ISSN 0003-0716.
- MacDonald, Malcolm (May 1992). "Chamber reviews". Gramophone. Vol. 69, no. 828. ISSN 0017-310X.
- Pwyll ap Siôn (July 2010). "Chamber reviews". Gramophone. Vol. 88, no. 1059. ISSN 0017-310X.
- "Reviews and Ratings of New Classical Albums". Billboard. November 24, 1956. ISSN 0006-2510.
- Simmons, Walter (July–August 1979). "Classical Recordings". Fanfare. Vol. 2, no. 6. ISSN 0148-9364.
- Simmons, Walter (July–August 2008). "American Saxophone Music". Fanfare. Vol. 31, no. 6. ISSN 0148-9364. Archived from the original on July 2, 2025.

==== Other ====
- Creston, Paul (1973) [Composed 1939]. Sonata for E♭ Alto Saxophone and Piano. Shawnee Press. OCLC 1113096525.
- Mauk, Steven (n.d.). "Master Lesson on Paul Creston's Sonata" (PDF). Ithaca College. Archived from the original (PDF) on June 16, 2010.
- Page, Tim (March 13, 1983). "Music: Debuts in Review". The New York Times. ISSN 0362-4331.
- "Paul Creston Collection". University of Missouri–Kansas City Libraries. n.d. Archived from the original on August 6, 2024.
- Schonberg, Harold (July 10, 1955). "Records: Contemporary Americans". The New York Times. ISSN 0362-4331.
