= Baron Knoop Stradivarius =

The Baron Knoop Stradivarius of 1698 is an antique violin made by luthier Antonio Stradivari of Cremona (1644–1736).

== See also ==
- List of Stradivarius instruments
- Stradivarius
- Baron Johann Knoop
