= David L. Fulton =

American musician (born 1944)

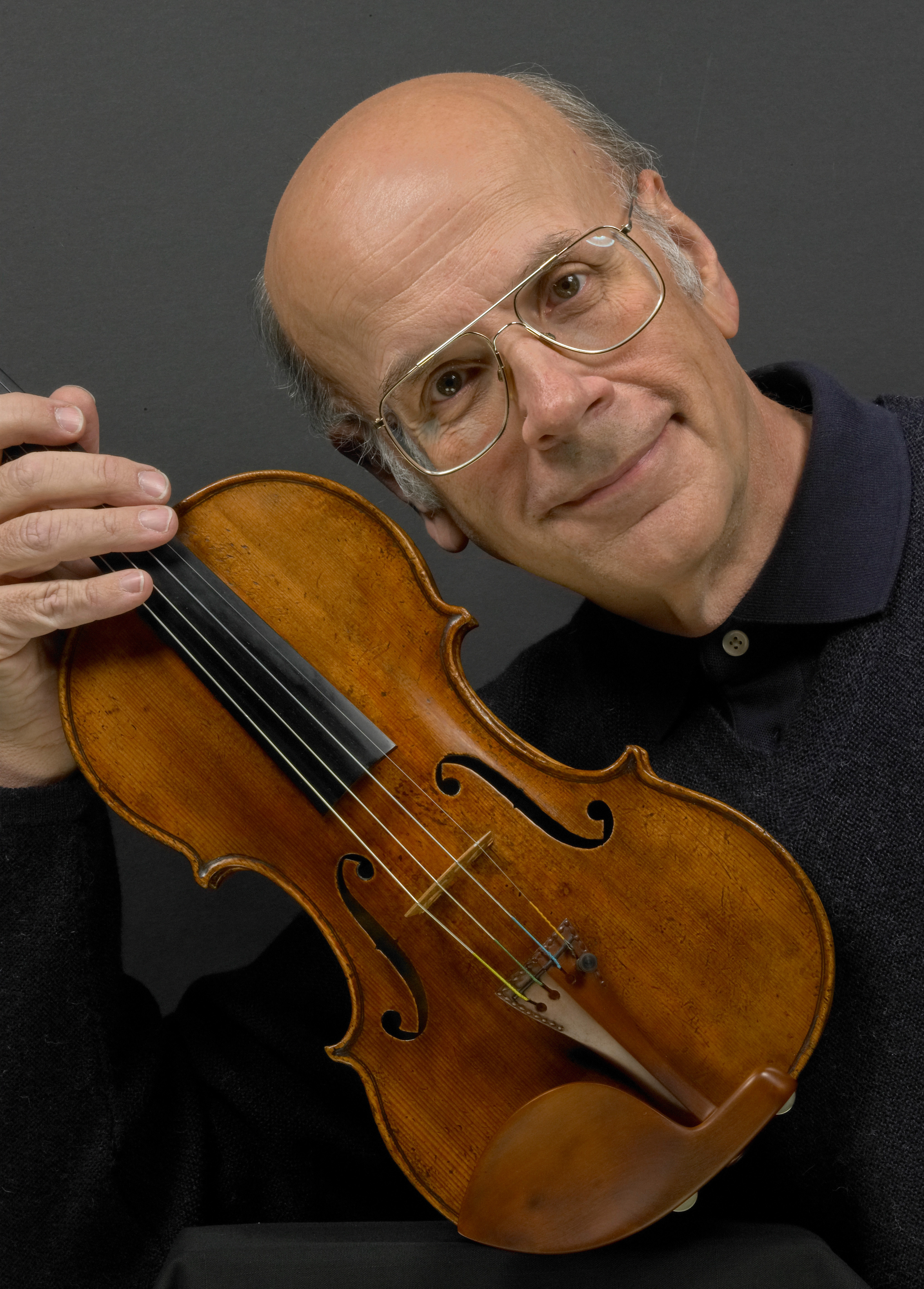
- Fulton & Lord Wilton (2008)
- Born: May 25, 1944 (age 82)
- Education: University of Chicago
- Occupations: Computer Science, collector, violinist
- Known for: Collector of rare instruments
- Website: davidfultoncollection.com

David LeRoy Fulton is a private collector of Cremonese instruments.

Born in 1944, he grew up in Eugene, Oregon, and began playing the violin from an early age. He studied mathematics at the University of Chicago, and was concertmaster of the University of Chicago Orchestra while he was there. Fulton also performed professionally for three years with the Hartford Symphony Orchestra as a violinist.

In 1970, after receiving his Ph.D. in Mathematical Statistics from the University of Connecticut, Fulton founded the Department of Computer Science at Bowling Green State University, serving as its professor and chairman for 10 years. In 2023 Bowling Green awarded him an honorary doctorate.

While still at Bowling Green, Fulton co-founded Fox Software, which ultimately gained international recognition for its database management application, FoxPro. After the sale of Fox Software to Microsoft in 1992, Fulton served as Microsoft's Vice President for Database Products until he retired in 1994.

Fulton has since assembled a collection of stringed instruments. At one point, the collection included 28 instruments, with eight by Antonio Stradivari and eight by Giuseppe Guarneri del Gesù.

Starting in 2017, Fulton dispersed his collection, ultimately giving all but one instrument to the David and Amy Fulton Foundation, which has sold them. The Foundation supports many musical organizations, the arts, theater festivals, as well as medical and Jewish causes. In 2025, the Foundation made it possible for the United States Library of Congress to acquire a Stradivari viola, now known as the “1990 Stradivari, Fulton, ex. Baird, Tuscan-Medici”.

Fulton has produced several documentary films about violins and music. The first was Homage (2008), which won the 2009 Juno award as "Classical Album of the Year: Solo or Chamber Ensemble". The film features violinist James Ehnes performing on fourteen instruments from Fulton's collection.

The second, Violin Masters: Two Gentlemen of Cremona, (2010), narrated by Alfred Molina and featuring renowned violinists James Ehnes, Joshua Bell, Midori, Itzhak Perlman, and others, examines the history and modern use of Stradivari and Guarneri del Gesù violins. Violin Masters won a 2012 Emmy in the "Documentary - Historical" category.

The third film, Transcendence: A Meeting of Greats, (2014), documents the sessions at which the Miró Quartet recorded Schubert's String Quartet No. 15, in G Major, D. 887. This film was nominated for two 2014 Emmy awards in the Special Event Coverage category, winning Best Director in that category.

His final film, Song of Rapa Nui (2020), is a documentary about the extraordinary career of the Rapa Nui (Easter Island) pianist and educator, Mahani Teave. This film was nominated for a 2020 Emmy in the Documentary - Cultural/History category.

In January 2022, Fulton published a large-format book about his violin collection entitled The Fulton Collection - A Guided Tour. A second edition published the following year includes a companion volume picturing Fulton's collection of 34 bows, 30 of which are by François Tourte and Dominique Peccatte.

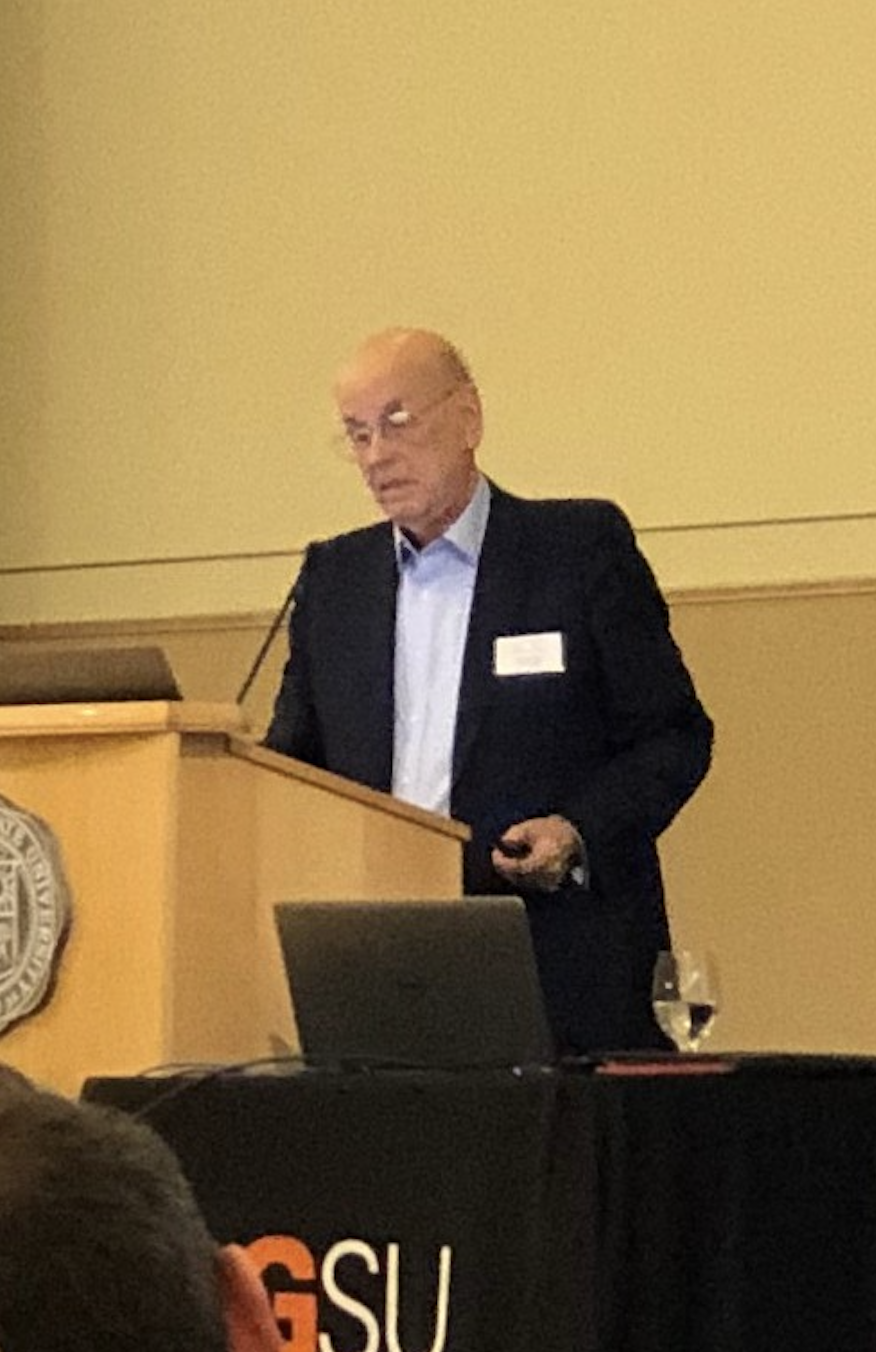
David Fulton giving a speech in 2019 at BGSU

== Instruments ==
Violins
Stradivari La Pucelle 1709
Stradivari "General Kyd, Perlman" 1714
Stradivari Marsick 1715
Stradivari "Baron d'Assignies" 1713
Stradivari "Alba, Herzog, Coronation" 1719
Stradivari "Sassoon" 1733
Stradivari "Baron Knoop, Bevan" 1715 (Note: bought for $2.75 million in February 1992, and sold in 2025 for the $23 million, the greatest sum ever paid for a violin at the time.)
Guarneri del Gesù "King Joseph" 1737
Guarneri del Gesù "Stern, Panette, Balâtre, Alard" 1737
Guarneri del Gesù "Lord Wilton" 1742
Guarneri del Gesù "Haddock" 1734
Guarneri del Gesù "d'Egville" 1735
Guarneri del Gesù "Kemp, Emperor" 1738
Guarneri del Gesù "Carrodus" 1743
Pietro Guarneri, of Mantua "Shapiro" 1698
Carlo Bergonzi "Kreisler, Perlman" 1735(?)
Giovanni Battista Guadagnini, Turin 1778
Violas
Andrea Guarneri "Conte Vitale" 1676
Gasparo da Salò "Krasner, Kelley" c. 1580
Giuseppe Guadagnini "Wanamaker, Rolla" 1793
Antonio & Girolamo Amati, Cremona 1619
Girolamo Amati (Hieronymus II or Girolamo Amati (II) 1703
Vincenzo Rugeri, Cremona 1697
Cellos
Stradivari "Bass of Spain, Adam" 1713
Pietro Guarneri, of Venice "Beatrice Harrison" 1739
Montagnana "George Gudgeon" 1737
Guarneri del Gesù "Messeas" 1731
