= Baron Knoop, ex-Bevan Stradivarius =

- Artist: Antonio Stradivari
- Year: 1715
- Medium: spruce, maple
- Location: unknown

Baron Knoop, ex-Bevan Stradivarius

The Baron Knoop, ex-Bevan Stradivarius is a violin made by the celebrated luthier Antonio Stradivari in Cremona, Italy in 1715 and named for Baron Johann Knoop (1846–1918). The Strad described this as having a "two-piece back of maple with a handsomely marked broad figure, extending slightly down from the centre joint. The top is of two pieces of spruce. The ribs and scroll are of similar wood, and the scroll chamfers still retain Stradivari’s black edging".

Stradivari's black edging on the scroll

== History ==
Knoop owned dozens of great violins, violas, and cellos at one time or another including four violas representing more than a third of extant Stradivari violas. Upon the sale of the instrument to J.E. Greiner through the agency of Wurlitzer in New York, the W. E. Hill firm in London, proposed that the violin be named for their customer, Baron Knoop. Several instruments by the great master luthiers bear the sobriquet Baron Knoop, including another Stradivari of 1715, the Alard-Knoop.

In their 1902 publication of Antonio Stradivari His Life and Work, while in the possession of London banker F.L. Bevan, the violin was referenced by the name Knoop, commenting that the violin is of "the first rank." Citing the letter provided to Greiner at the time of his purchase of the Baron Knoop, the Hills commented that it was the violin upon which Knoop most enjoyed playing.

The instrument was purchased by collector David L. Fulton for $2.75 million in February 1992. In a transaction brokered by Bein & Co 33 years later, it was sold for the $23 million, the highest sum ever paid for a violin. The previous record belongs to the Vieuxtemps Guarneri in 2013. According to Fulton, the violin he acquired had been badly revarnished, and was subsequently painstakingly restored. John Becker worked for three months on the instrument to strip the applied varnish. Fulton also declared it to be his favourite, and that he would keep it " as long as I can draw a bow"

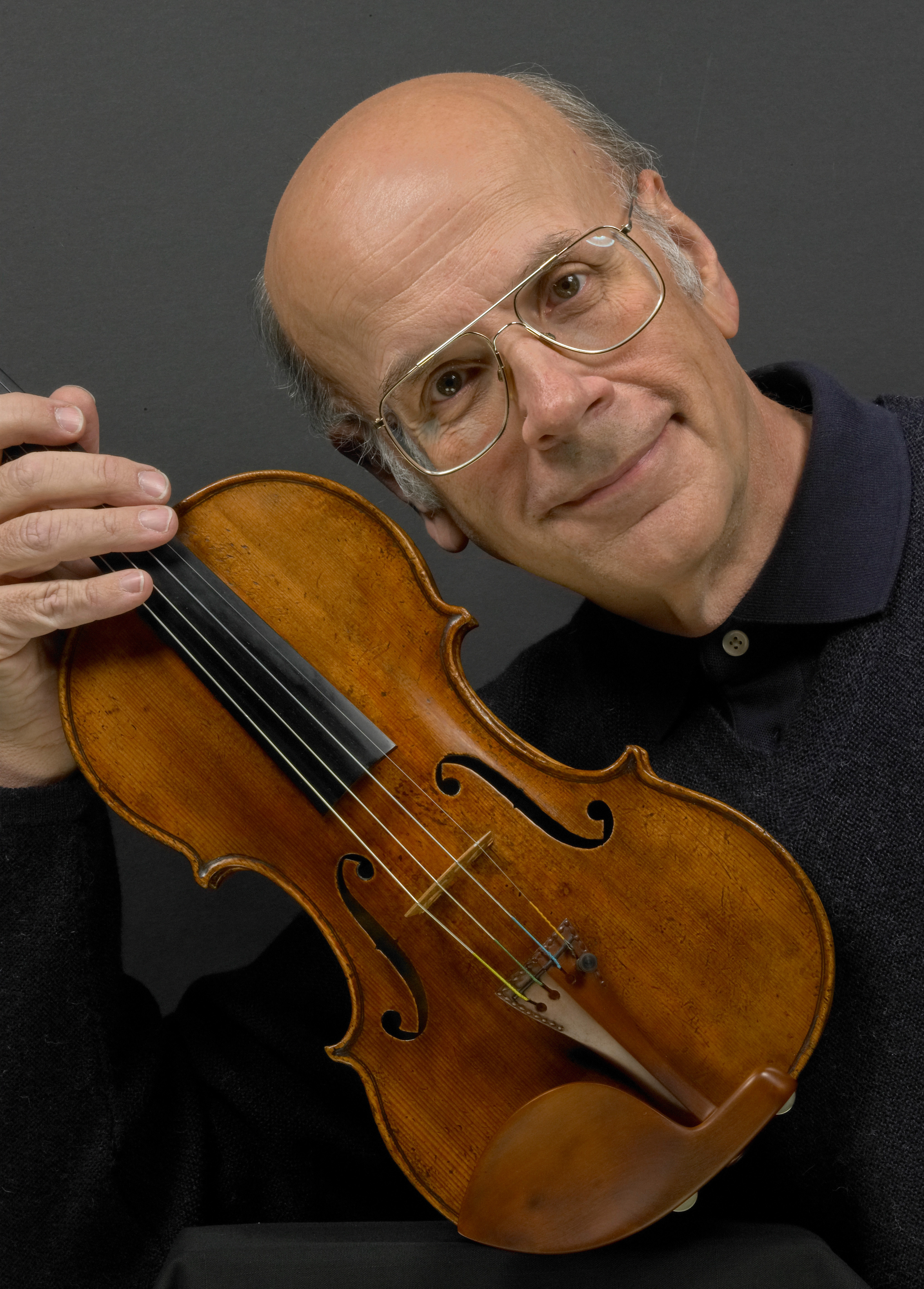
Fulton with Lord Wilton 2008

== Subjective impressions ==
According to David Fulton, the instrument is tonally unsurpassed. He described it thus: "supple, very easy to play, has a powerful, resonant bass register, and a treble register that is silvery with lots of “sizzle".

== Provenance ==
Rogoff; Oechsner, 1870–81; C.G. Meier 1881; Kloop; F.L. Bevan 1910; Richard Bennett 1913; J.E. Greiner, 1929; J. Frank Otwell, 1944–47; Raymond Cerf, 1954–78; David L. Fulton, 1992–2025; anonymous, 2025–.

== See also ==
- Stradivarius
- List of Stradivarius instruments
