= Charles Roland Berry =

American composer

Charles Roland Berry is an American composer. His notable works include Olympic Mountains Overture.

== Early life and education ==
Berry was born in 1957 in Boston, Massachusetts. He studied classical guitar for a short time at the University of Michigan.

He began composing solo pieces for violin and guitar at Allan Hancock College in Santa Maria, California. He then transferred to the College of Creative Studies at the University of California, Santa Barbara, where he studied with British composer and symphonist Peter Racine Fricker.

In 1982, he met Paul Creston in San Diego, California, and studied composition with him for one year.

== Career ==
For a time, he hosted a classical radio program on KBOO, community radio, in Portland, Oregon. He would host telephone interviews with famous composers. Some of these people included; Benjamin Lees, John Cage, George Crumb, George Rochberg, Ned Rorem, Karel Husa, and William Schuman. Berry edited the interviews to make them a half-hour in length, often adding excerpts of the particular composers music.

In Santa Cruz, California, he became acquainted with the Hungarian cellist, composer, and former conductor for the Honolulu Symphony, George Barati. In the 1990s he presented performances of his music in San Francisco with George Barati, Lou Harrison, and an electronic composer, Charles Amirkhanian. Mr. Berry records exclusively for Centaur Records. His Cello Concerto, Symphony No. 3 and other works were released in 2008 on Centaur CD #2898.
