= La Pucelle (violin) =

Violin made by Antonio Stradivari in 1709

La Pucelle, also known as The Virgin, is a 1709 violin made by Antonio Stradivari.

== Etymology ==
It was Parisian dealer, luthier and maker Jean-Baptiste Vuillaume who gave the instrument its name. In the mid-19th century, Vuillaume disassembled the instrument for maintenance and observed, to his amazement, that the violin had remained untouched since it left Stradivari's workshop. He exclaimed, "C'est comme une pucelle!" ("It's like a virgin"!) The name stuck and that has been the violin's name ever since.

== History and provenance ==
Jean-Baptiste Vuillaume created the instrument's tailpiece carved with the image of a woman in armor, Joan of Arc, the virgin warrior known as "La Pucelle d'Orléans". Vuillaume also created the instrument's elaborately carved pegs.

According to the celebrated violin expert Charles Beare, La Pucelle is the first example of the instruments forming Stradivari's "Golden Period", the pilot model.

The violin is currently owned by collector David L. Fulton. He calls it one of his finest items in his collection and considers it one of the finest Stradivari instrument in the U.S. He described La Pucelle as having no cracks, no retouching, no worn-down corners or edges. It was once owned by heiress Huguette Clark, given to her on her 50th birthday in June 1956 by her mother Anna. Clark sold the violin to Fulton in 2001 under a contract that would conceal the identity of the seller for 10 years.

"It really has an amazing purity of tone, but purity with
incredible breadth as well. I think that it's like a beam
of light that is very strong and very wide. ... I've never
seen another violin like it."
— Canadian violinist James Ehnes
