= Baron Johann Knoop =

Baron Johann Knoop (22 July 1846 in Moscow – 9 May 1918 in Wadhurst), was a collector of musical instruments who possessed a total of 29 great violins, violas, and cellos at one time or another including some four Stradivari violas. Several instruments are named after him:

- Baron Knoop Stradivarius (1698)
- Alard-Baron Knoop Stradivarius (1715)
- Baron Knoop; ex-Bevan Stradivarius (1715)

Knoop's father, Johann Ludwig Knoop (1821-1894), emigrated from Germany to Russia, founded a textile industry in Narva, Estonia, and was granted title of Baron in the Russian Empire, which he passed to his sons.
