= Marsick Stradivarius =

1715 violin

The Ex-Marsick Stradivarius of 1715 is a violin named after Belgian violinist and teacher Martin Pierre Marsick (1847–1924), who owned the instrument made by Antonio Stradivari of Cremona. The instrument, valued at approximately US$8 million, was purchased in 1999 by David L. Fulton who loaned it to violinist James Ehnes, who bought it from Fulton a decade later.

At a pre-concert talk at Colston Hall in Bristol, England, on 28 November 2005, James Ehnes took pains to differentiate the instrument he was playing from that played by David Oistrakh. Ehnes was playing a 1715 Stradivarius formerly owned by Marsick, while Oistrakh played the Marsick Stradivarius of 1705.
