= Cecil Leeson =

American musician

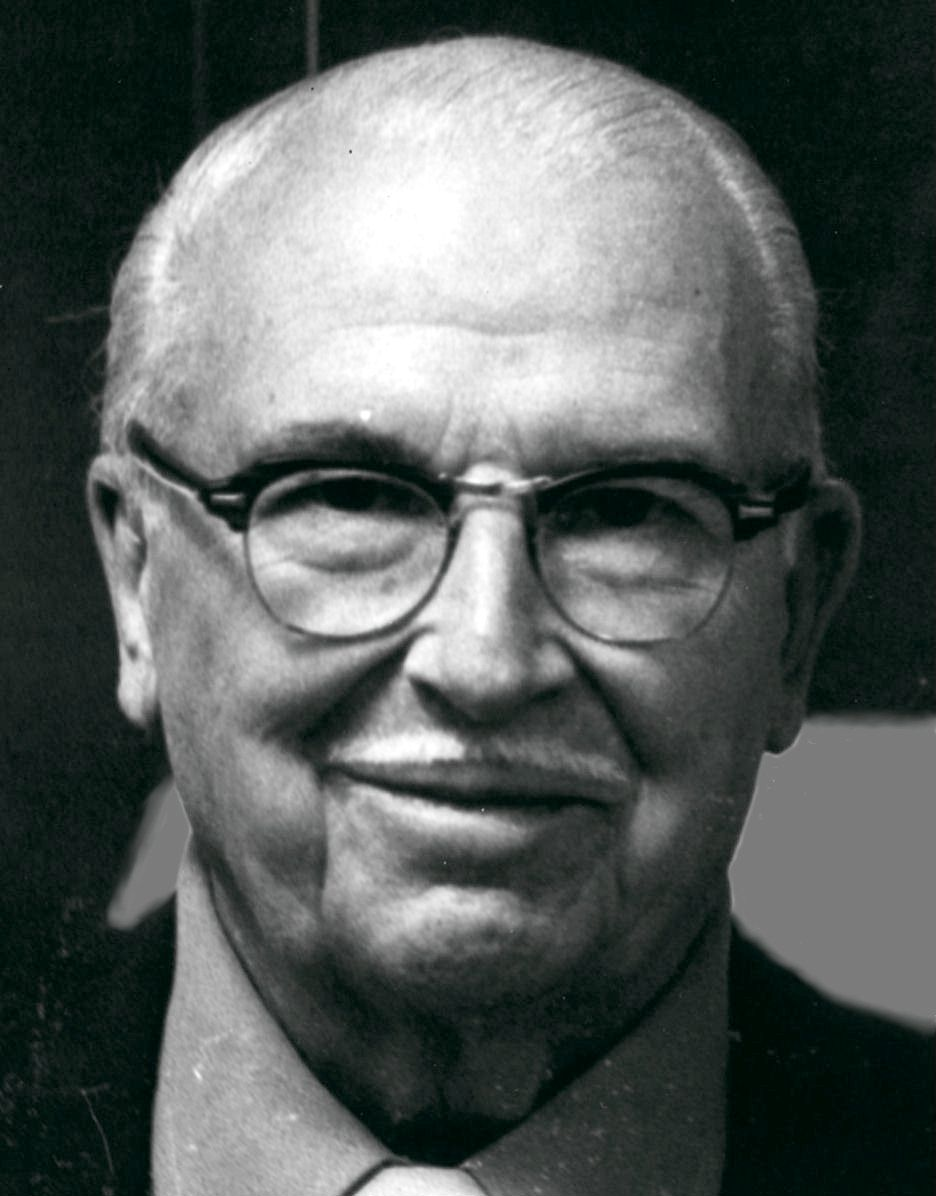
- Cecil Leeson, in the 1960s
- Born: October 16, 1902
- Died: April 17, 1989 (aged 86)
- Occupation: Saxophone

Cecil B. Leeson (October 16, 1902 – April 17, 1989) was an American musician and teacher who was widely credited with establishing the saxophone as a legitimate concert instrument in the United States.

== Early life ==
While Leeson lived in the southwestern United States, he received a degree from the Tempe Normal School of the Arizona State Teacher's College. He then began studying engineering at the University of Arizona, at which point he began playing saxophone. In 1921, Cecil Leeson enrolled as a saxophone major in Dana's Musical Institute in Warren, Ohio (today a part of Youngstown State University), graduating in 1925.

== Career ==
Beginning in 1926, he worked on occasion in various commercial groups in Detroit and Ohio, including broadcasts on Cleveland's radio station WHK and WJAY in 1927. Musicians Guy Lombardo and his brother Carmen Lombardo were then active in Cleveland, and Leeson began directing the Lombardo School of Saxophone, established by Carmen in 1926, by early 1927.

His approach to classical saxophone playing differed from jazz and dance saxophone music popular at the time, and helped promote classical saxophone style in a mainstream medium. A writer in the Hollywood News said that "in Leeson's capable hands, the saxophone [is] no longer the blatant jazz instrument of popular conception, but an instrument of really beautiful tone color [...]. If there were other saxophonists who could play as Leeson does, the saxophone would speedily make its appearance in the symphony orchestra."

In the early 1930s, he joined the faculty at the Hollywood Conservatory of Music and taught there for several years. He considered his formal "concert debut" to have been a Hollywood Conservatory recital on June 11, 1931. By 1934 he was working and performing in New York, including an October 1934 recital at the Barbizon Hotel. In July 1936 he visited a series of universities in the midwestern and southwestern United States offering summer musical institutes. In the summer of 1937 and 1939, Leeson taught at the National Music Camp in Interlochen, Michigan.

From 1934 to 1939, Leeson collaborated with American composer Paul Creston, resulting in several major pieces for the classical saxophone repertoire, which they premiered. Leeson and Creston recorded the composer's "Suite" (a-sax/pno) in 1938 for New Music Quarterly Recordings (catalog 1314-A-B).

On February 5, 1937, Cecil Leeson was the first saxophonist to play at Town Hall in New York City. He was also one of the first saxophonists to appear as a soloist with major American symphony orchestras. More than 50 works for saxophone were written for him by composers such as Leon Stein, Edvard Moritz, Paul Creston, and Ferde Grofé.

Leeson taught saxophone performance at Northwestern University from 1955 to 1961 and then at Ball State University. His papers and his collection of original Adolphe Sax and other famous saxophones are in the National Music Museum at the University of South Dakota.

The 2nd World Saxophone Congress, held in Chicago in 1970, "honored Leeson for 50 years of pioneering and contributing to the establishment of the saxophone in the field of music."

According to Stephen Cottrell, "Leeson's style of saxophone performance established in the United States a school of classical saxophone playing that differed from the European model."
