= Martin Pierre Marsick =

Belgian violinist, composer, and teacher

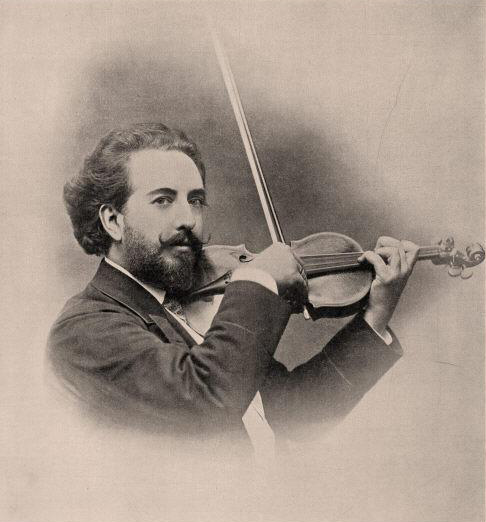
- Marsick photographed by Otto Wegener (before 1895)

Background information
- Born: Martin Pierre Joseph Marsick; 9 March 1847; Jupille, Belgium
- Died: 21 October 1924 (aged 77) Paris, France
- Education: Royal Conservatory of Liège; Royal Conservatory of Brussels; Conservatoire de Paris
- Occupations: Violinist; singer; organist; composer; teacher
- Instruments: Violin; voice; organ
- Spouse: Adolphine Adrienne Berthe Mollot (m. 1872, divorced)

Martin Pierre Marsick (1847–1924), was a Belgian violinist, organist, singer, composer and teacher. Marsick was the owner of the Marsick Stradivarius.

== Early life and education ==
Martin Pierre Joseph Marsick was born on 9 March 1847^{α} in Jupille (part of present-day Liège) to Pierre Joseph Marsick, a Tinsmith, and Anne Marie Bevers. At the time of his birth, Marsick was the youngest of 5 children and by 1868 was one of 18 children. Through his brother Louis François, Marsick was the uncle of the Belgian composer and conductor Armand Marsick. As a child Marsick was a member of the choir at St. Martin's Basilica in Liège, and was a member of the choir school at Liège Cathedral.

=== Education ===
On 2 December 1854, Marsick enrolled at the Royal Conservatory of Liège, where he studied music composition, piano and the organ alongside the violin. Marsick would study violin under Rodolphe Massart, Auguste Dupont and from 1857 onwards with Désiré Heynberg. In 1865, Marsick graduated with the Premier Prix in violin, a shared Second Prix in the organ and the Médaille en vermeil, the highest distinction for “exceptional merit”.

From 1865 to 1867, Marsick continued his music education at the Royal Conservatory of Brussels, studying violin under Hubert Léonard and composition under Hubert Ferdinand Kufferath. With the financial backing of patrons, Marsick studied violin under Lambert Massart at the Conservatoire de Paris from 1868 to 1869. Marsick was awarded the 1st prize for violin in 1869. From 1870 to 1871, a scholarship from the Belgian Government enabled Marsick to study in Berlin under Joseph Joachim.

== Career ==
In 1871, Marsick joined the newly established Société Nationale de Musique.

In 1873, Marsick made his Paris début at the Concerts Populaires (present-day Pasdeloup Orchestra). Marsick formed the Quatuor Marsick string quartet with Guillaume Rémy, Louis van Waefelghem and Jules Delsart in 1877.

Between 1875 and 1895, he performed in concerts in collaboration with the leading conductors in Paris - Charles Lamoureux, Jules Pasdeloup, and Édouard Colonne, while also touring the rest of Europe and the United States. In 1895, Marsick made his American début. He played additionally with Joseph Joachim and in a trio with the cellist Anatoliy Brandukov and the pianist Vladimir von Pachmann.

In 1892, Marsick replaced Eugène Sauzay as a violin teacher at the Conservatoire de Paris. Marsick students included Carl Flesch, Jacques Thibaud, George Enescu, Simon Pullman and Cécile Chaminade.

In 1900, Marsick left both his wife and the Conservatoire de Paris in order to live abroad with his mistress. However, in 1903 Marsick returned to Paris but was unable to regain his previous success.

=== Violins ===
From 1904, Marsick owned a Stradivarius crafted by Antonio Stradivari in 1715, which later became known as the Marsick Stradivarius.

Marsick also owned the 1705 Marsick Stradivarius during 1879–1880. From 1902–c. 1907 Marsick owned what was later named the Schneiderhan violin.

== Personal life and death ==
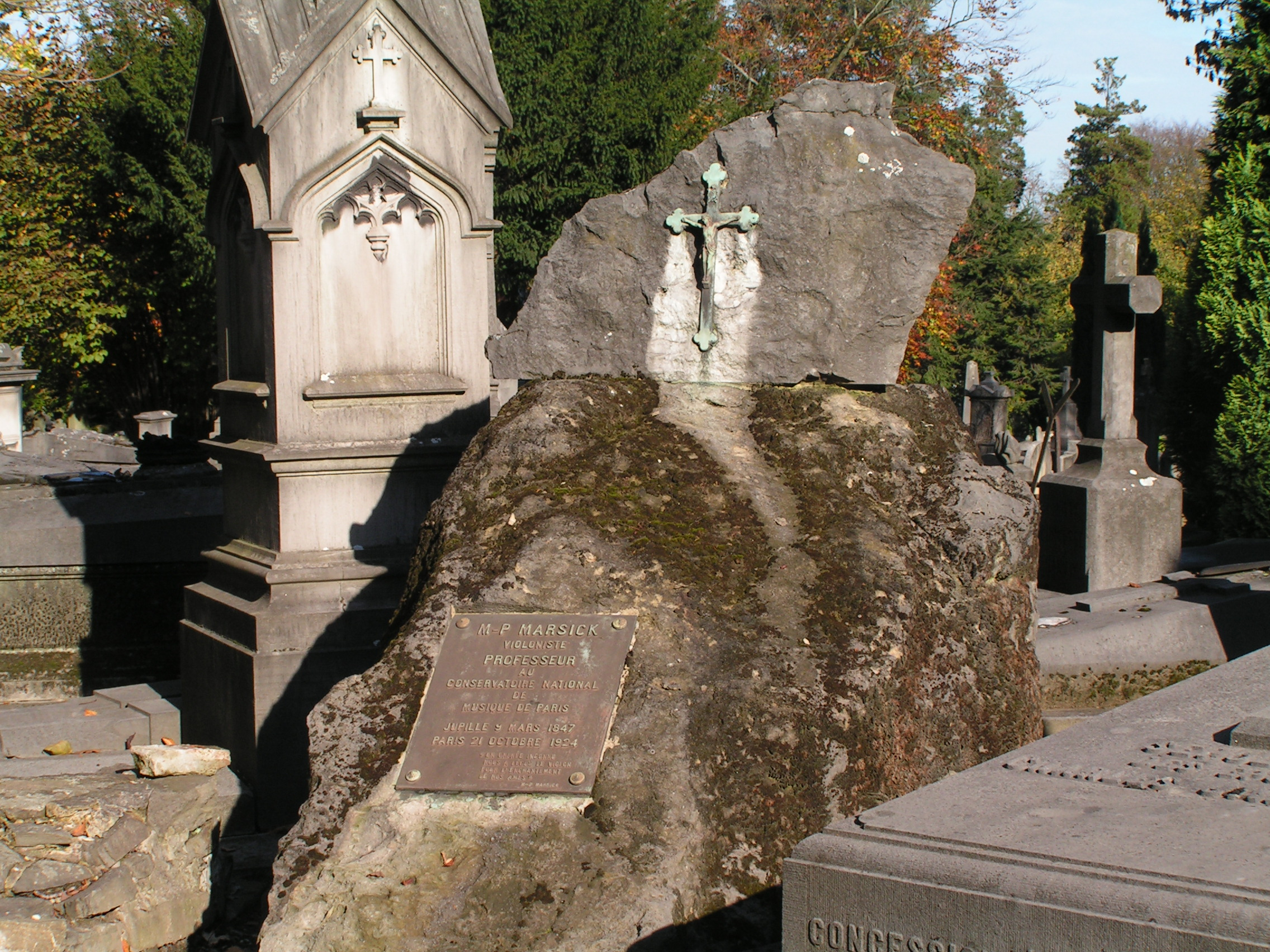
Marsick's grave at the Cimetière de Robermont, Liège

On 23 February 1872, Marsick married Adolphine Adrienne Berthe Mollot (1848– 1923) in Chatou. The couple later divorced.

On 21 October 1924, Marsick died aged 77 in Paris. Marsick is buried at the Cimetière de Robermont in Liège.

== Selected works ==
Marsick published a series of finger exercises entitled Eureka in 1906 and his La Grammaire du violon appeared in 1924. Besides these, he composed the septet Souvenir de Naples for strings, flute, and clarinet; a piano quartet; and a lyric drama, Le Puits.

Stage

- Le Puits, Lyric Drama (c.1900); libretto by Auguste Dorchain

Chamber music

- Rêverie in B major for violin and piano, Op. 4 (1879)
- 2 Morceaux for violin and piano, Op. 6 (1879)

1. Adagio
2. Scherzando

- Pater noster, Prière for violin and piano with organ ad libitum, Op. 7 (1882)
- 3 Pièces for violin or cello and piano, Op. 8 (1882)

3. Capriccioso in A minor

- Airs de Ballet de Françoise de Rimini de Ambroise Thomas, 2 Transcriptions for violin and piano (1883)

1. Adagio et Capriccio
2. Pastorale, Scherzo, Habanera

- Rêverie No. 2 for violin and piano or string quartet, Op. 15 (1885)
- Songe for violin and piano, Op. 16 (1891)
- Tarentelle for violin and piano, Op. 19 (1897)
- Nocturne for violin and piano, Op. 20 (1897)
- Poème d'été for violin and piano, Op. 24 (1900)

1. Captivante
2. Exaltation
3. Attente
4. Valse triomphe

- Fleurs des cimes for violin and piano, Op. 25
- Valencia (au gré des flots) for violin and piano, Op. 26
- Les Hespérides for violin and piano, Op. 27
- Petites fleurs musicales de l'âme for violin and piano (1901)
- Petite romance expressive for violin and piano, Op. 32 (1901)
- Souvenir de Naples for 2 violins, viola, cello, double bass, flute and clarinet, Op. 33
- Piano Quartet for violin, viola, cello and piano, Op. 43
- Au pays du soleil, Poème for violin and piano

Pedigogical

- Eureka!, Mécanisme nouveau pour "se mettre en doigts" en quelques minutes (Eureka!, New Technical Exercises), Op. 34 (1905)
- La Grammaire du violon (1924)

== Notes ==
^α Often miscited as 1848.
