= Edvard Moritz =

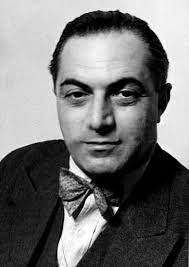
Edvard Moritz

Edvard Moritz (actually: Eduard Moritz) (Hamburg, 23 June 1891 – New York City, 30 September 1974) was a German-American composer, music pedagogue, director, violist, and pianist.

For certain works he used the pseudonym Herbert Loé as well as a name variation Edward Moritz.

== Life ==
Moritz was the son of Ernst Moritz, a merchant and shopkeeper and his wife Fanny Moritz. As a child, he received music and violin lessons from Heinrich Bandler, then concertmaster of the Hamburg Philharmonic Orchestra. From 1909 he studied in Paris with Martin Marsick (violin) and with Louis-Joseph Diémer (piano). According to Erich H. Müller[1] he also studied with Claude Debussy, although the latter did not give composition lessons. In Berlin he studied violin with Carl Flesch, piano with Ferruccio Busoni and composition with Paul Juon; he also studied conducting in Leipzig with Arthur Nikisch.

== Career ==
Moritz lived in Berlin and from there he went on concert tours as a violinist and later mainly as a guest conductor in other cities and abroad (England, France, Spain, Portugal and Italy). He gradually also began to compose. In 1919 his Burleske op. 9 was premiered by the Berlin Philharmonic conducted by Arthur Nikisch.

After the takeover of political power by the National Socialist German Workers' Party in 1933, Moritz was persecuted because of his Jewish origins and forced to restrict his activities at events of the Jewish Cultural Association. In 1934 he gave house concerts with chamber music in Hamburg as a violist; in 1934/1935 he was conductor of the newly founded Jewish chamber orchestra in Hamburg, in which well-known Jewish professional musicians and soloists participated, such as Ilse Urias, Jakob Sakom and Hertha Kahn. This orchestra financed itself mainly by performances with the Jewish Society for Art and Science. It also played works by Moritz during these concerts, for example Streicher Scherzo on 10 November 1934. In 1936 a new string orchestra was founded, conducted by Moritz. He was also conductor of the Jewish Chamber Orchestra Berlin in 1936–1937. Although he was first admitted as a "non-Aryan member", he was expelled from this professional organization on 19 August 1935, which was equivalent to a professional ban. In 1935 he was included in the so-called Goebbels List[1], which served as a form of censorship.

In September 1937 he travelled with a visa from Gothenburg on the ship S.S. Königstein (Arnold Bernstein Line) from Antwerp to New York. His New York debut was st Town Hall on 2 May 1938 with the Edvard Moritz Chamber Orchestra.

In 1940 he became a teacher of piano and composition at the La Follette School of Music in New York. One of his students there was the pop singer Bobby "Chain Gang" Scott. In 1943 he became a naturalized U.S. citizen.

== Compositions ==
=== Works for orchestra ===
- 1919 Burleske, op. 9
- c. 1925 Kammersymphonie no. 1, op. 30
- 1934 Streicher Scherzo for string orchestra
- 1944 Yemenite Suite
- American overture
- Concerto grosso
- Italian overture
- Kammersymphonie no. 2, op. 34
- Nachtmusik, op. 17
- Der Klingende Garten, for baritone and orchestra
- Symphony in C minor

==== Concertos for orchestral instruments ====
- Concerto, for violin and orchestra, op. 21
- Concerto, for piano and orchestra
- Concerto, for 2 violins and orchestra
- Concerto, for alto saxophone and orchestra, op. 97
- Concerto, for viola and orchestra, op. 98
- Concerto, for cello and orchestra
- Double concerto, for violin, cello and orchestra

=== Works for band ===
- 1927 Concerto for band, op. 55
- Divertimento, for band and harp

=== Musical theater ===
==== Operas ====
Circe (of: Über allen Zauber Liebe)	3 acts

==== Ballets ====
Die Dschinnijah, op. 31	1 act

=== Vocal music ===
==== Cantatas ====
- ca. 1933 Der ewige Ruf, for alto and string quartet, op. 60 – text: Grete Gulbranson, Paul Verlaine, Rondell en Oskar Loerke

==== Choral works ====
- c. 1921 Reception, suite for soprano solo and women's voices a capella, op. 3 – text: (part 2) Hans Bethge
- c. 1921 Two Choirs, for four women's voices (solo or chorus) a capella, op. 4

==== Lieder ====
- 1918 Quartet, for 2 violins, viola and cello with soprano solo, op. 10 – text: Anton Lindner and Oscar Loerke
- before 1921 Fünf Lieder, for voice and piano, op. 5
- before 1921 Fünf Lieder, for voice and piano, op. 6
- before 1921 Three duets, for soprano, alto and piano, op. 8
- before 1921 Four Chinese songs, for voice and piano, op. 15
- before 1925 Four serious songs, for voice and piano, op. 18 – text: Rainer Maria Rilke, Lucie Hecht and Anton Wildgans
- before 1925 Drei heitere Lieder, for voice and piano, op. 19 – text: Camill Hoffmann, Alexander von Bernus, Ludwig Finckh
- before 1925 Five Chinese songs, for voice and piano, op. 26 – text: Richard Wilhelm, Klabund, Hans Bethge
- before 1925 Vier Fabeln von Gotthold Ephraim Lessing, for voice and piano, op. 28
- 1925 Unter der Linden, aria for high soprano, flute and harp, op. 31 – text: Walther von der Vogelweide, poem: Christian Morgenstern
- c. 1925 Zwei Duette aus "Des Knaben Wunderhorn", for coloratura soprano and tenor with piano, op. 32
- 1930 Die Beständigen, for voice and piano – text: Alfred Henschke (1890–1928), based on the Chinese text: Li-Tai-Po (701–762)
- 1939 Fire and Ice, for voice and piano – text: Robert Frost
- 1939 I feel near to some high thing, for voice and piano – text: William Ellery Leonard 1939 Improvisation, for voice and piano – text: Alfred Kreymborg
- 1939 You and I, for voice and piano – text: Ludwig Lewisohn Gitanjali, 3 songs for baritone and orchestra, op. 27
- Four Lieder on Texts of George A. Goldschlag, for voice and piano, op. 75
  1. Chinesisches Lied
  2. Wie sinnlos traurig...
  3. Prophet
  4. Kanonierlied

=== Chamber music ===
- (1921) Scherzo, for violin and piano, op. 2
- 1924 Suite, for cello solo, op. 20a
- 1924 Suite, for viola solo, op. 20b
- (before 1925) (Piano-)Quintet, for 2 violins, viola, cello and piano, op. 23
- (before 1925) String Quartet No. 1, op. 25
- (before 1925) Drei Capricen, for violin and piano, op. 29
- (before 1925) Fünf Stücke, for violin and piano, op. 33
- (1926) String Quartet No. 2 in A major, op. 27?
- 1928 Wind Quintet, op. 41
- 1928 Small Sonata, for flute and piano, op. 49
- 1937 Blues: concert piece, for violin and piano, op. 54
- 1939 Sonata, for viola and piano, op. 83
- 1939 Sonata, for violin and piano, op. 84
- 1939 Sonata, for violin and piano, op. 85
- 1939 Sonata No. 1 in E♭ major, for alto saxophone and piano, op. 96
- 1940 Andante, for saxophone quartet
- 1941 Soloflight, for trumpet and piano
- 1942 Divertimento, for three B♭ clarinets
- 1942 Concerto – as played by Gregor Piatigorsky, for cello and piano, op. 106
- 1956 Divertimento, for flute, clarinet and bassoon, op. 150
- 1960 Pavane, for clarinet and piano
- 1960 Scherzo, for bassoon and piano, op. 104b
- 1963 Wind Quintet No. 2, op. 169
- 1968 Quartet, for saxophone quartet, op. 181
- 1968 Wind Quintet,
- 1969 Intermezzo, for alto saxophone and piano, op. 103,
- Quintet, for alto saxophone and string quartet, op. 99
- Quartet, for saxophone quartet, op. 81
- Sonata No. 2, for alto saxophone and piano
- La danse d’Edna, potpourri for 5 wind instruments

=== Works for piano ===
- 1917 Vier pianostukken, op. 1
- 1918 Drie intermezzi, op. 12
- 1921 Scherzo in C majeur, op. 16
- 1925 Vier stukken, op. 22
- 1926 Vier stukken, op. 35
- 1932 Karussel
- 1940 Keyboard caricatures – 7 impressions
- 1945 Animated Intervals: Eight little promenades

== Bibliography ==
- Jozef Robijns, Miep Zijlstra: Algemene muziek encyclopedie, Haarlem: De Haan, 1979–1984, ISBN 978-90-228-4930-9
- Ursula Pesek, Hans-Peter Schmitz (Fwd): Flötenmusik aus drei Jahrhunderten : Komponisten : Werke : Anregungen, Basel: Bärenreiter, 1990, 320 p.
- Habakuk Traber, Elmar Weingarten: Verdrängte Musik : Berliner Komponisten im Exil, Berlin: Argon Verlag, 1987, 376 p.
- Jean-Marie Londeix: Musique pour saxophone, volume II : répertoire général des oeuvres et des ouvrages d' enseignement pour le saxophone, Cherry Hill: Roncorp Publications, 1985.
- E. Ruth Anderson: Contemporary American composers – A biographical dictionary, Second edition, Boston: G. K. Hall, 1982, 578 p., ISBN 978-0-816-18223-7
- Erich H. Müller: Deutsches Musiker-Lexikon, Dresden: Wilhelm Limpert, 1929, 1644 p.
