= Paul Creston =

American classical composer (1906–1985)

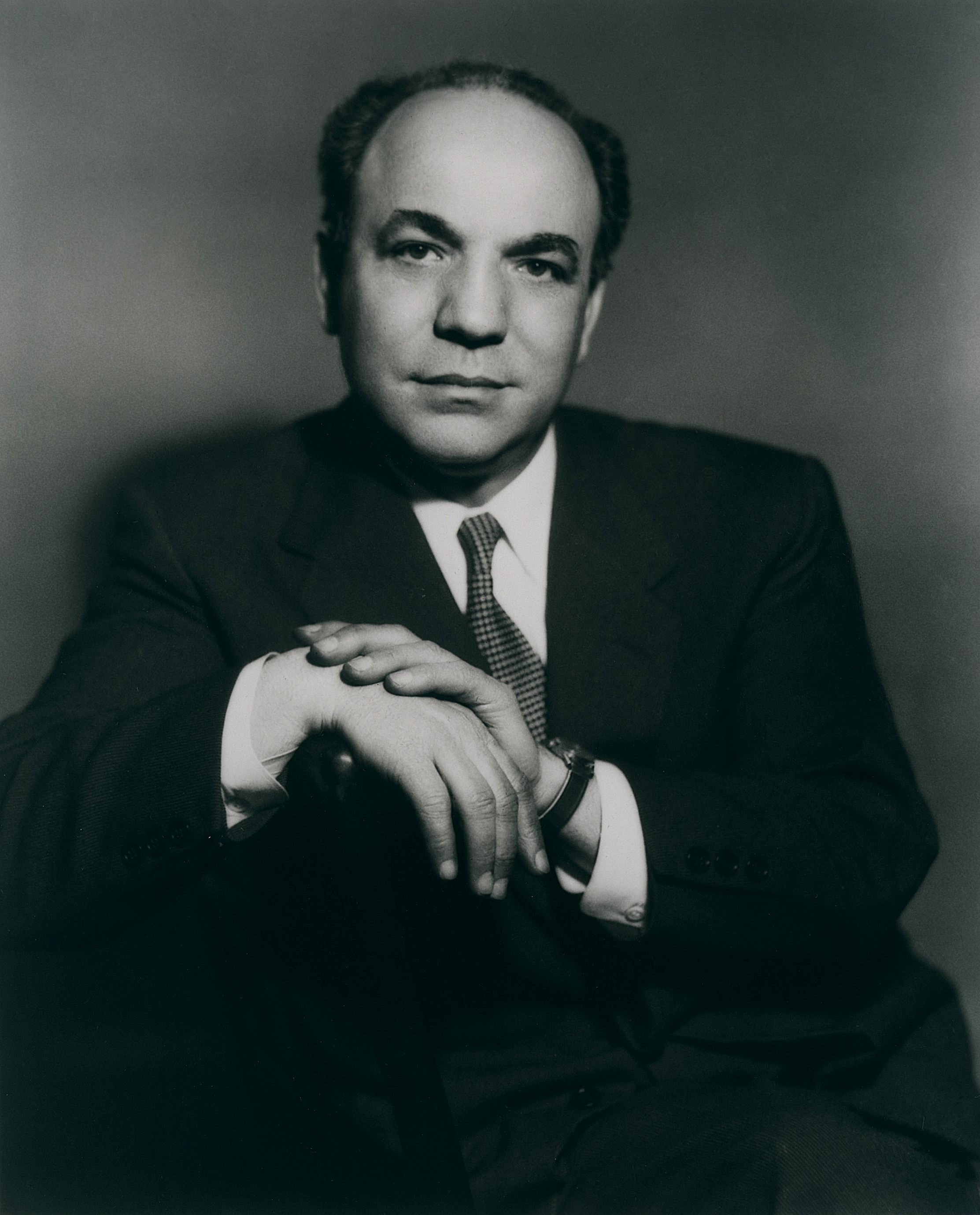
- Creston c. 1944–1956
- Born: Giuseppe Guttoveggio; October 10, 1906; New York City, U.S.
- Died: August 24, 1985 (aged 78); Poway, California, U.S.
- Occupations: Composer, organist, educator
- Years active: 1926–1985
- Spouse: Louise Gotto
- Awards: American Academy of Arts and Letters; Guggenheim Fellowship; New York Music Critics' Circle Award

Paul Creston (born Giuseppe Guttoveggio; October 10, 1906 – August 24, 1985) was a prolific American composer of classical music and an organist. His catalogued works number over 120 compositions in several major musical genres. They include six symphonies, several concertante and virtuoso works for violin, piano, accordion, marimba, saxophone and trombone. He has been described as a leading American Neo-Romantic composer of his time whose music was performed widely during the 1940s and 1950s.

== Biography ==
Born in New York City to Sicilian immigrants, Gaspare Guttovergi and Carmela Collura from the village of Prizzi, Creston was self-taught as a composer and received formal training on both the piano and organ. Along with Samuel Barber, Ernest Bloch, Nicolas Flagello, Vittorio Giannini and Howard Hanson, he has been cited as one of several leading American Neo-Romantic composers whose "body of work is characterized by an overall seriousness of purpose ... (which) attempt(s) to address the fundamental existential and spiritual concerns of humanity". His work tends to be fairly conservative in style, with a strong rhythmic element.

=== Early life: 1906–1932 ===
Like many early Italian immigrants to the United States, Creston's father Gaspare (1883–1965) was a proud and industrious man who attained employment as a painter, plasterer, butcher and traveling salesman to support his growing family. His mother Carmela (1886–1947) would secretly contribute to his efforts from time to time by taking in sewing projects at their home on East 17th Street in Gramercy Park, Manhattan. The family included Creston's older brother Charles who was born three years before Creston in Italy.

Creston credits both his parents for recognizing his musical talents and encouraging his early musical development. At the age of four, his father instructed him in the performance of Sicilian folk tunes while providing accompaniment on the guitar. He was also exposed to the clarinet by his uncle Cola in an Italian circus band several years later and would frequently pretend to play the piano at the family's dinner table. This inspired Creston's parents to purchase a neighbor's piano and to arrange for the start of formal piano lessons.

At the early age of eight, Creston began formal studies on the piano while studying operatic overtures. In addition, he diligently taught himself on his brother's violin while improvising tunes which he heard in performances on a hurdy-gurdy outside the family's apartment. While studying in elementary school and at DeWitt Clinton High School in 1919 he also exhibited an interest in literature and writing poetry. He even commenced work on a novel while continuing to compose music based upon his own improvisations. He soon received the nickname "Cress” from his fellow students after a character he portrayed in a play The Fan. In later years, he would modify the nickname to Creston and legally adopted it for his surname in 1944.

While in high school, Creston developed some doubts about the future of his musical training. His subsequent exposure to performances of Chopin's piano compositions and the operatic orchestration of Puccini soon provided additional inspiration. Yet Creston was still too poor to purchase musical scores directly for his own studies or to attend performances of classical music. Undaunted, he spent hours after school in the public libraries of New York City studying musical scores and comparing their structure to music programmed on WNYC's Masterworks Hour program on the radio. With the urging of a high school friend, Creston subsequently undertook additional studies on the piano over the course of several years with several instructors including Gaston Dethier, Carlo Stea and G. Aldo Randegger.

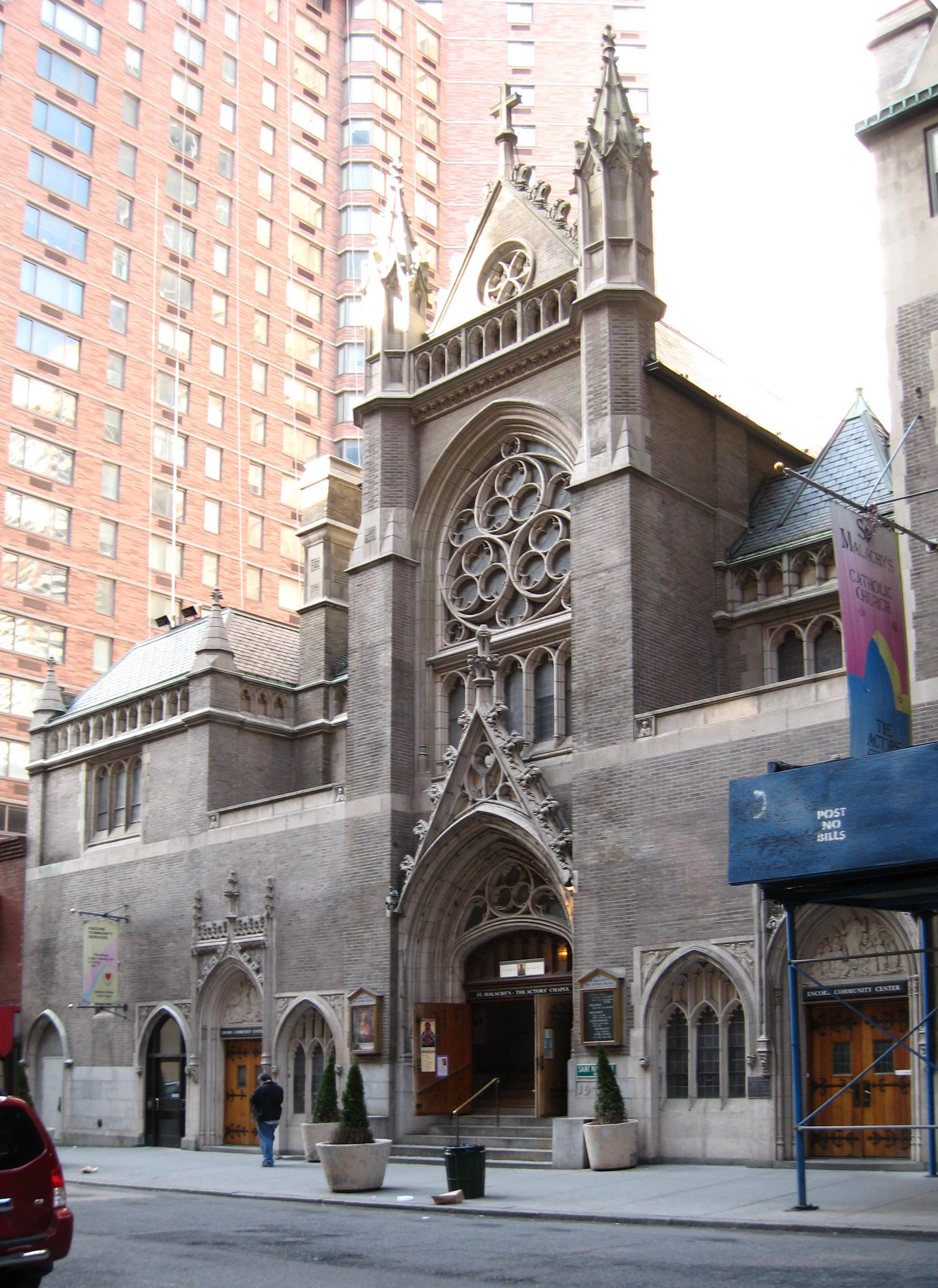
St. Malachy Roman Catholic Church, 239 W 49 St

Creston soon encountered financial difficulties at the age of fifteen, however. After completing two and one half years of high school, he was compelled to abandon his formal education in order to pursue employment. In 1921 he acquired a clerical position at MacFadden Publications but continued his studies in music after work. By 1923 he acquired a clerical position as a bank clerk for the Foreign Exchange Department of the Irving Bank and from 1924 to 1926 as a claims examiner with the Metropolitan Life Insurance Company. During this time he also studied English, foreign languages, philosophy and mysticism on his own. His personal studies in music composition and orchestration continued as he focused on the works of Bach, Scarlatti, Chopin, Debussy, and Ravel. With the assistance of a fellow parishioner at St. Malachy's Church in Manhattan, Creston also acquired free practice time on the pipe organ and undertook lessons in 1925 with Pietro Yon who was the organist at St. Patrick's Cathedral as well as an honorary organist at the Vatican. From 1926 to 1929 he also mastered the art of musical improvisation while performing as a theater organist at several venues in New York including the New York Coliseum Theater, the Cassello Theater and the landmark Lynbrook Theater, on Long Island.

In 1927 Creston married the dancer, Louise Gotto (1903–1989) while she was employed as a secretary at McFadden Publications in New York City. Louise was one of twelve children born to Joseph Gotto and Rosario Filpi from Solerno, Italy. Louise's family was poor and she aspired to a career as a professional dancer. She was a student of Ruth St. Denis, Ted Shawn and subsequently an initial member of the Martha Graham dance company in New York City. In addition to performing in Stravinsky's The Rite of Spring at the Radio City Music Hall in the early 1930s, Louise choreographed a work by Creston for the Martha Graham troupe. Louise was also gifted musically and had an influence on Creston's use of rhythm and dance in music he composed for other members of Graham's company. Their first child Paul Julian died only six weeks after childbirth in 1937. In subsequent years the couple raised two additional sons Joel Anthony in 1938 and Timothy William in 1942.

The arrival of the Great Depression in 1929 disrupted Creston's professional ambitions once again. In addition, the use of sound became more widespread in motion pictures and theatre organists were becoming increasingly obsolete. Consequently, Creston was forced to accept assignments as an accompanist in performances at elementary schools while also selling real estate and insurance. His literary talents proved to be invaluable during this time. From 1926 until 1929 he published several articles in Dance Magazine and Etude Magazine. By 1932 he decided to augment his performances as an organist by also focusing on composing music.

=== Career: 1933–1985 ===
Creston premiered his first major work in 1933 with a composition of incidental music for the play Iron Flowers. While helping to support his immigrant family, Creston served for three decades as an organist and choirmaster at St. Malachy's Church from 1934 until 1967 in New York City. He soon received two Guggenheim fellowships in composition during 1938 and 1939. Subsequently, he also earned high critical praise in 1943 when his Symphony No. 1 (Op. 20) received the New York Music Critics' Circle Award. Nine years later, the same composition received international recognition and was awarded the first prize in the Paris International Commission.

In addition to his endeavors as a composer, Creston emerged as a conductor for a quartette from 1944 to 1950 on the radio program The Hour of Faith. During the 1940s and 1950s he continued to compose while serving as an instructor in composition at over fourteen colleges and universities. His works were now also widely performed by leading orchestras both in the United States and abroad including: the New York Philharmonic which premiered his Symphony No. 2 (Op. 35) in 1945, the National Symphony Orchestra which introduced his Symphony No. 4 (Op. 52) in 1952, and the Boston Symphony Orchestra which performed his works while performing as the first American Orchestra invited to concertize in the Soviet Union. His compositions were also showcased by such acclaimed conductors including Arturo Toscanini, Eugene Ormandy, Leopold Stokowski, and Howard Mitchell. Commissions from a wide range of impresarios of both jazz and classical music soon followed including Paul Whiteman, the Ford Foundation, the American Accordionists' Association, the Juilliard School of Music and Eastern Airlines. In 1956 he was elected President of the National Association for American Conductors and Composers, and served as a guest composer and lecturer of jazz and classical music at fourteen colleges and universities in the United States during the 1960s, 1970s and 1980s.

External image
- Creston and Central Symphony Orchestra in Washington, c. 1975–1980, digital.library.umkc.edu

In 1960, the U.S. State Department granted Creston a stipend as an American specialist to lecture about American music internationally in Turkey and Israel. He also joined the faculty of the New York College of Music as a Professor of Composition and Orchestration in 1963 and 1967. From 1960 until 1968 he served on the board of directors of the American Society of Composers, Authors and Publishers (ASCAP). In 1968, he emerged as an artist-in-residence at Central Washington State College in Ellensburg, Washington where he remained on the faculty as a professor of music until his retirement in 1975. He also continued to appear as a guest composer for colleges and orchestras in the United States until 1980.

Creston remained active as a composer even in the twilight years of his life. The United States Army Band premiered his Festive Overture (Op. 116) in 1981. Inspired by Rabindranath Tagore's philosophical work Sadhana: The Realization of Life, Creston also premiered his Sādhanā for Cello and Orchestra, (Op. 117) in collaboration with the Los Angeles Chamber Orchestra under the direction of Gerard Schwarz in 1981. His last major work Symphony No. 6 (Op. 118) "Organ Symphony" was commissioned by the American Guild of Organists and premiered in 1982 at the Kennedy Center in Washington D.C.

In late 1984, Creston developed an illness related to the emergence of a malignant tumor. While residing at the National Healthcare Home in Poway, California he passed away on August 24, 1985.

=== Honors ===
In addition to his two Guggenheim fellowships in 1938 and 1939, Creston was honored with the Citation of Merit from the National Association for American Composers and Conductors (1941), the Music Award of the American Academy of Arts and Letters (1943) the Citation of Honor from the National Catholic Music Educators Association ()1956, the Christopher Award (1958) in recognition of his score for the CBS television series The twentieth Century: "Revolt in Hungary" and a New York Emmy Award (1964) for his score to the CBS television documentary series Eye on New York - In the American Grain about the poet William Carlos Williams.

== Compositions ==
Creston was one of the most performed American composers of the 1940s and 1950s. His Symphony No. 2, Op. 35 has been described as, "a major landmark of American Neo-romanticism and one of the most significant Amercian symphonies of the 1940s." Several of his works have become staples of the wind band repertoire. Zanoni, Prelude and Dance and the Celebration Overture have been and still are on several state lists for contests across the USA. While evaluating Creston's work in 1956, the conductor Howard Mitchell observed, "If a composer's message is to be considered great by people of other countries, the music must be of such significance in its glorification of the composer's own country that it speaks above and beyond national boundaries in a universal message that people everywhere can understand. This hallmark of greatness characterizes Creston's music. Similarly, the Italian-American conductor Alfredo Antonini praised him as his favorite composer in 1958.

His pieces include six symphonies; a number of concertos including two violin concertos and a marimba concerto which was premiered by Ruth Stuber; a piano concerto, premiered by Earl Wild; concerto for two pianos and orchestra; an accordion concerto; and a concerto for alto saxophone which was dedicated to Cecil Leeson. He composed a fantasia for trombone and orchestra which was composed for Robert Marsteller and also premiered by him. For alto saxophone, he wrote also a Rapsodie for Jean-Marie Londeix; a suite (1935) and a sonata (Op. 19, 1939), dedicated to Leeson. The sonata was arranged by Marco Ciccone for saxophone and orchestra in 2008. Creston also composed a suite for organ, Op. 70. Several of his works were inspired by the poetry of Walt Whitman.

=== Concerto for Accordion and Orchestra ===
External image
- Creston with composer Virgil Thomson at an ASCAP awards function c. 1961–1970, digital.library.umkc.edu

Much of Creston's virtuoso music for solo instrument and orchestra showcases unusual "neglected" instruments including the saxophone, trombone, marimba, harp and accordion. His Concerto for Accordion and Orchestra (Op. 75) was commissioned by the American Accordionists' Association in 1960 as part an effort to showcase the suitability of the young instrument for the international concert hall stage. The music theorist Robert Young McMahan described it as "one of the most virtuosic works in the stradella accordion repertoire," which incorporates jazzy syncopations, extended tertian chord structures, Lydian modal scale sources and elements of translucent Debussyian impressionism. The composition was premiered in the United States by the Boston Pops Orchestra under the baton of Arthur Fiedler with Carmen Carrozza as soloist in 1960. Subsequently, it was performed by the Denver Symphony Orchestra in 1961 and the Seattle Symphony Orchestra in 1972. In modern times, it has also been performed internationally by the Italian accordion virtuoso Francesco Palazzo with the Orchestra della Città Metropolitana di Bari under the musical direction of Giovanni Rinaldi and by the Canadian accordionist Michael Bridge as accompanied by the pianist Cecilia Lee.

=== Tangential variations ===
Scholars have noted that Creston's compositions embody a flamboyant, lush impetuosity which overlies a disciplined orderliness based upon an intricate internal logic. In addition to the use of traditional thematic development, Creston's compositions feature a harmonic language which incorporates non-functional triads and pandiatonicism. Creston himself also made reference to his use of "tangential variations" as derived from the works of polyphonist composers during the Renaissance in order to convey the improvisational quality of jazz music in his music. According to Henry Cowell, Creston's technique is apparent in the development of modal Gregorian chants in the Symphony No. 3 (Op. 48) Three Mysteries as he intertwined a, "Gregorian melody served up with romantic passion, sometimes with impressionistic instrumentation, with 20th-century dissonance and rhythm; now and again atonal implications are found check-by-jowl with the ecclesiastical modes.

As a creative musical artist, Creston remained loyal to his vision of musical composition as an expression of a Neo-romantic ideal framed within the context of a traditional musical heritage. In Creston's view, "all the elements of music – rhythm, melody, counterpoint, harmony, form and tone color – should be given due consideration to attain the perfect balance of a good musical composition." This was in contrast to attempts made by several of his peers to create a distinctly American "sound", including Aaron Copland, Morton Gould and Roy Harris. Creston's compositions also illustrate his enduring commitment to transcend mutually exclusive ascetic polarities by synthesizing both the expression of emotion and the evocation of mood with a formal intellectual coherence, an economical development of classical musical forms and overall structural integrity. For as Creston observed:

I consider music, and more specifically the writing of it, as a spiritual practice. This may be at complete variance with the speculations of art theorists, but inasmuch as it pertains to my way of life I have found it the most satisfactory justification for my pursuit of art."

== Educator ==
Creston was also a highly regarded professor of composition, whose students included the composers Irwin Swack, John Corigliano, Alvin Singleton, Elliott Schwartz, Frank Felice, Charles Roland Berry; accordionist and composer William Schimmel; the conductor Gerard Schwarz and the jazz musicians Rusty Dedrick and Charlie Queener.

The use of rhythm in music was of particular interest to Creston and he wrote several texts on the subject including the theoretical books Principles of Rhythm (1964) and Rational Metric Notation (1979) both of which were based upon his Six Preludes (Op. 38) for piano from 1945. His unpublished work Creative Harmony embodies his views on the use of harmony in music.

He was a member of the music faculty at Central Washington State College from 1968 to 1975. In addition, from 1960 until 1980 he served a guest composer on the faculty of several major academic research centers in the United States including: the University of California, Los Angeles, the University of Colorado Boulder, the University of Delaware, the University of Minnesota and New York University.

(See List of music students by teacher: C to F §Paul Creston)

== Death ==
Creston died in 1985 at age 78 in Poway, California, a suburb of San Diego.

== Archive ==
- The Paul Creston Collection, primary archival repository for the works of Creston. It is housed within the LaBudde Special Collections at the University of Missouri–Kansas City (UMKC) Libraries and was donated by the composer's wife Louise Creston in 1987. It includes over 300 handwritten scores and drafts for his 121 opus-numbered works, personal papers, historic photographs and audio recordings of performances.

== Selected works ==
External audio
- Paul Creston's tone poem Corinthians XIII (Op. 82) played by The Louisville Orchestra in 1965

=== Stage ===
- Two Choric Dances – "Time Out of Mind", Ballet, Op. 17a (1938)
- A Tale About the Land, An American Folk Ballet for voice, piano, clarinet and percussion, Op. 23 (1940)

=== Orchestral ===
- Out of the Cradle Endlessly Rocking (1934); after a poem by Walt Whitman
- Gregorian Chant for string orchestra; arrangement of movement III from String Quartet, Op. 8
- Fugue for string orchestra; arrangement of movement IV from String Quartet, Op. 8
- Threnody, Op. 16 (1938)
- Two Choric Dances, Op. 17 (1938); for chamber orchestra (Op. 17a) or orchestra (Op. 17b)
- Symphony No. 1, Op. 20 (1940)
- Prelude and Dance, Op. 25 (1941)
- A Rumor, Op. 27 (1941)
- Pastorale and Tarantella, Op. 28 (1941)
- Chant of 1942, Op. 33 (1943)
- Frontiers, Op. 34 (1943)
- Symphony No. 2, Op. 35 (1944)
- Poem, Op. 39 (1945)
- Homage for string orchestra, Op. 41 (1947)
- Symphony No. 3 "Three Mysteries", Op. 48 (1950)
- Symphony No. 4, Op. 52 (1951)
- Walt Whitman, Op. 53 (1952)
- Invocation and Dance, Op. 58 (1953)
- Dance Overture, Op. 62 (1954)
- Symphony No. 5, Op. 64 (1955)
- Lydian Ode, Op. 67
- Toccata, Op. 68 (1957)
- Pre-Classic Suite, Op. 71 (1957)
- Janus, Op. 77 (1959)
- Corinthians XIII, Tone Poem, Op. 82 (1963)
- Choreografic Suite, Op. 86 (1965); for chamber orchestra (Op. 86a) or orchestra (Op. 86b)
- Introit "Hommage à Pierre Monteux", Op. 87 (1965–1966)
- Airborne Suite (1966)
1. Evening in Texas
2. Sunrise in Puerto Rico
3. High Noon – Montreal
4. Midnight – Mexico
- Pavanne Variations, Op. 89 (1966)
- Chthonic Ode "Homage to Henry Moore" for large orchestra with euphonium, celesta and piano, Op. 90 (1966)
- Thanatopsis, Op. 101 (1971)
- Suite for string orchestra, Op. 109 (1978)
- Symphony No. 6 "Organ Symphony" for organ and orchestra, Op. 118 (1981)
- Evening in Texas
- Kangaroo Kaper
- Rumba – Tarantella
- Sunrise in Puerto Rico

=== Concert band ===
- Legend, Op. 31 (1942)
- Zanoni, Op. 40 (1946)
- Celebration Overture, Op. 61 (1954)
- Prelude and Dance, Op. 76 (1959)
- Anatolia (Turkish Rhapsody), Op. 93 (1967)
- Kalevala, Fantasy on Finnish Folk Songs, Op. 95 (1968)
- Jubilee, Op. 102 (1971)
- Liberty Song '76, Op. 107 (1975); also for mixed chorus and concert band
- Festive Overture, Op. 116 (1980)

=== Concertante ===
- Concertino for Marimba and Orchestra (or concert band), Op. 21 (1940) (premiered by Ruth Stuber)
- Concerto for saxophone and orchestra, Op. 26 (1941)
- Concerto for alto saxophone, Op. 26 (1944)
- Fantasy for piano and orchestra, Op. 32 (1942)
- Dawn Mood for piano and orchestra, Op. 36 (1944)
- Poem for harp and orchestra, Op. 39 (1945)
- Fantasy for trombone and orchestra (or concert band), Op. 42 (1947)
- Concerto for piano and orchestra, Op. 43 (1949)
- Concerto for 2 pianos and orchestra, Op. 50 (1950)
- Concerto No. 1 for violin and orchestra, Op. 65 (1956)
- Concerto for accordion and orchestra, Op. 75 (1960)
- Concerto No. 2 for violin and orchestra, Op. 78 (1960)
- Fantasy for accordion and orchestra, Op. 85 (1964); also for accordion solo
- Sādhanā for cello and orchestra, Op. 117 (1981)

=== Chamber music ===
- Three Poems from Walt Whitman for cello and piano, Op. 4
- Suite for alto saxophone or clarinet and piano, Op. 6 (1935)
- String Quartet, Op. 8 (1936)
- Partita for flute, violin (or 2 violins) and piano (or string orchestra), Op. 12 (1937) ["Air" from Partita also arranged for Organ]
- Suite for viola and piano, Op. 13 (1938)
- Suite for violin and piano, Op. 18
- Sonata for alto saxophone and piano, Op. 19 (1939)
- Meditation for marimba and organ (arrangement of movement II of Concertino, Op. 21)
- Homage for viola (or cello), harp and organ, Op. 41 (1947); also for string orchestra
- Lydian Song for harp solo, Op. 55 (1952)
- Suite for flute, viola and piano, Op. 56 (1953)
- Suite for cello and piano, Op. 66 (1956)
- Olympia, Rhapsody for harp solo, Op. 94 (1968)
- Concertino for piano and woodwind quintet, Op. 99 (1969)
- Ceremonial for percussion ensemble and piano, Op. 103 (1972)
- Rapsodie for saxophone and organ, Op. 108 (1976)
- Suite for saxophone quartet, Op. 111 (1979)
- Piano Trio, Op. 112 (1979)
- Cantilena from Sadhana for cello and piano, Op. 117 (1981); original for cello and orchestra; also for voice and piano
- Fanfare for Paratroopers for brass

=== Keyboard ===
- Hippo's Dance for piano
- Kangaroo Kaper for piano
- Little Red Pony for piano
- Moment Musical for piano (1926)
- Phases: Dance Suite for piano
- Prelude and Dance for piano
- Antitheses for piano (1930)
- A Chant of Work for piano (1930)
- Five Dances for piano, Op. 1
- Music for "Iron Flowers" for piano (1933?); incidental music for the play by Cecil Lewis
- Seven Theses for piano, Op. 3 (1933)
- Variations on "The First Noel" for organ (1934)
- Sonata for piano, Op. 9
- Five Two-Part Inventions for piano, Op. 14 (1946)
- Five Little Dances for piano, Op. 24
- Prelude and Dance for piano, Op. 29
- Six Preludes for piano, Op. 38
- Prelude and Dance for accordion, Op. 69 (1957)
- Suite for organ, Op. 70
- Fantasia for organ, Op. 74 (1958)
- Wedding Recessional for organ (1961)
- Three Narratives for piano, Op. 79 (1962)
- Pony Rondo (a.k.a. Rondino) for piano solo (1964)
- Rapsodia Breve for organ, Op. 81 (1963)
- Metamorphoses for piano, Op. 84 (1964)
- Fantasy for accordion solo, Op. 85 (1964); also for accordion and orchestra
- Rumba-Tarantella for piano 4-hands (1964)
- Song of Sicily for piano (1964); from the TV film The Twentieth Century: Invasion of Sicily
- Rhythmicon, Piano Studies in Rhythm, 10 Books (1964–1977)
- Interlude for piano (c.1966)
- Embryo Suite for accordion solo, Op. 96 (1968)
- Variation for Eugene Ormandy (On the Occasion of His 70th Birthday) for piano (1969)
- Romanza for piano, Op. 110 (1978)
- Offertory for piano, Op. 113 (1980)
- Interlude for piano, Op. 114 (1980)
- Prelude and Dance for 2 pianos, Op. 120 (1982)

=== Vocal ===
- Seems Lak de Love Dreams Just Wont Last for voice and piano (c.1923); words by Marguerite T. George
- "I Am He Who Walks the States ..." for voice and piano
- The Bird of the Wilderness for voice and piano, Op. 2
- Thanatopses, 4 Songs to Death for voice and piano (or voice, piano and string quartet), Op. 7 (1935); words by Rabindranath Tagore
- Three Sonnets for voice and piano, Op. 10 (1936); words by Arthur Davison Ficke
- Dance Variations for coloratura soprano and orchestra, Op. 30 (1941–1942)
- Psalm XXIII for high voice and piano, Op. 37 (1945); original for soprano, mixed chorus and orchestra
- Three Songs for voice and piano, Op. 46 (1950); words by Edward Pinkney and John Neihardt
- The Lambs to the Lamb for voice and piano, Op. 47 (1950); original version for female chorus and piano or organ; words by Martha Nicholson Kemp
- French Canadian Folk Songs for voice and piano, Op. 49 (1950)
- Ave Maria for voice and piano, Op. 57 (1953)
- La Lettre for voice and piano, Op. 59 (1954)
- A Song of Joys for voice and piano, Op. 63 (1955); words by Walt Whitman
- Song of Sicily for voice and piano (1964); from the TV score Invasion of Sicily
- Nocturne for soprano or tenor and 11 instruments, Op. 83 (1964); words by W. H. Auden
- Palermo in the Moonlight for voice and piano (1964); words by Mitchell Parish
- From The Psalmist for contralto and orchestra, Op. 91 (1967)
- Cantilena from Sadhana for voice and piano, Op. 117 (1981); original for cello and orchestra; also for cello and piano
- Carousel Song for voice and piano; words by Arthur Newman

=== Choral ===
- Three Chorales from Tagore for mixed chorus a cappella, Op. 11; words by Rabindranath Tagore
- Missa Pro Defunctis ("Requiem Mass") for male chorus and organ, Op. 15 (1938)
- Dedication for mixed chorus and piano (or organ, or string orchestra), Op. 22 (1940); originally entitled Dirge; words by Arturo Giovannitti
- Here Is Thy Footstool for mixed chorus a cappella
- Psalm XXIII for soprano, mixed chorus and orchestra, Op. 37 (1945); also for voice and piano; also a version for male chorus and piano
- Missa Solemnis for mixed chorus or male chorus and organ or orchestra, Op. 44
- Two Motets for male chorus and organ, Op. 45 (1950)
- The Lambs to the Lamb for female chorus and piano or organ, Op. 47 (1950); also a version for voice and piano; words by Martha Nicholson Kemp
- Black and Tan America for baritone, mixed chorus and piano, Op. 51 (1951); words by Charles H. Stern
- Missa "Adoro Te" for mixed chorus and organ, Op. 54 (1952)
- Cindy for mixed chorus and piano (1953)
- Prayer of Thanksgiving for mixed chorus and organ (1953)
- Way Up on Old Smoky for mixed chorus and organ (1953)
- The Celestial Vision for male chorus a cappella, Op. 60 (1954); words by Dante, Walt Whitman, and from the Bhagavad Gita
- My Lord Upon a Sickle Hangs for mixed chorus (1955?); words by Louis J. Maloof
- Praise the Lord for mixed chorus a cappella, Op. 72
- Lilium Regis for mixed chorus and piano, Op. 73 (1958); words by Francis Thompson
- Isaiah's Prophecy, A Christmas Oratorio for soprano, mezzo-soprano, 2 tenors, 2 baritones, bass, mixed chorus and orchestra, Op. 80 (1962)
- Mass of the Angels for unison voices (1966)
- Now Thank We All Our God for mixed chorus and organ, Op. 88 (1966)
- None Lives For Ever for female chorus and piano or organ, Op. 92 (1967); words by Rabindranath Tagore
- Missa "Cum Jubilo" for mixed chorus a cappella (or with piano, organ, or string orchestra), Op. 97 (1968)
- Hyas Illahee: A Corosymfonic Suite (The Northwest Corosymfonic Suite) for mixed chorus and piano, Op. 98 (1969)
- Leaves of Grass for mixed chorus and piano, Op. 100 (1970); words by Walt Whitman
- Calamus for baritone, mixed chorus, brass ensemble, timpani and percussion, Op. 104 (1972); words by Walt Whitman
- Liberty Song '76 for mixed chorus and concert band, Op. 107 (1975); also for band
- Prodigal for mixed chorus and piano, Op. 115 (1980); words by Renato M. Getti
- O Come, Let Us Sing for mixed chorus and organ, Op. 119 (1982); text adapted from Psalms 92, 95, and 96

=== TV and film scores ===
- Lake Carrier (1942)
- Brought to Action (1945)
- Air Power, TV series (1956)
- The Twentieth Century, TV series (7 episodes, 1958–1964)
  - The Russo-Finnish War (November 16, 1958)
  - Revolt in Hungary (December 14, 1958); Creston received a Christopher Award.
  - The Frozen War (February 8, 1959)
  - Suicide Run to Murmansk (November 1, 1959)
  - Typhoon at Okinawa (November 26, 1961)
  - The Great Weather Mystery (December 24, 1961)
  - Invasion of Sicily (January 19, 1964)
- In the American Grain, documentary on poet William Carlos Williams; Creston won an Emmy Award for his score.

=== Incomplete works ===
Pantonal Lullaby, Op. 121

=== Literary works ===
- Principles of Rhythm, F. Colombo, New York (1964)
- The Beat Goes On (1969)
- Creative Harmony, New York (1970)
- Music and Mass Media (1970)
- A Composer's Creed (1971)
- Rational Metric Notation, Exposition Press, New York (1979)

== Bibliography ==
- Creston, Paul (1964). Principles of Rhythm. New York: F. Columbo. OCLC 335167.
- Creston, Paul (1979). Rational Metric Notation : the Mathematical Basis of Meters, Symbols, and Note-Values. Hicksville, New York: Exposition Press. ISBN 0-682-49052-0. OCLC 6086922.
