= RCA Thesaurus =

Supplier of electrical transcriptions

RCA Thesaurus, a brand owned by RCA Victor, was a supplier of electrical transcriptions. It enjoyed a long history of producing electrical transcriptions of music for radio broadcasting which dated back to NBC's Radio Recording Division.

Efforts were made as early as 1936 to consolidate The RCA Victor Transcription service with NBC's independent transcription service within the NBC radio network. NBC'sThesaurus catalog system and library of recordings was not completely merged with RCA's catalog until 1939 when the consolidation was completed in an effort to compete with rival transcription services which were available at the Mutual, Columbia and World Broadcasting Systems.

During the 1950s, RCA Thesaurus produced under the musical direction of Ben Selvin in New York City. As the transcription service continued to grow in 1953, RCA Thesaurus bought a library of 1600 transcriptions of jingles from the Ullman Jingl Library.

In 1954, John Serry recorded several of his arrangements of easy listening music for RCA Thesaurus with his ensemble The Bel-Cordions quartet and the Serry Sextette. The group consisted of four accordions, string bass and guitar. Copies of Serry's album and his original orchestral scores were subsequently donated years later to the Eastman School of Music's Sibley Music Library for archival purposes within the Ruth T. Watanabe Special Collections Department: John J. Serry Sr. Collection.

By 1955, RCA Thesaurus continued to expand its musical library by including complete shows five times a week which showcased performances by several leading jazz artists including Sammy Kaye and Freddie Martin. In 1956, Lawrence Welk also signed with Ben Selvin at RCA Thesaurus for recordings on his "New Lawrence Welk Show". By 1956, Ben Selvin also signed an agreement with the impresario Norman Granz which enhanced the RCA Thesaurus library to include performances by such jazz luminaries as: Count Basie, Roy Eldridge, Ella Fitzgerald, Stan Getz, Gene Krupa, Oscar Peterson, and Art Tatum.

== Classical compositions ==
Included among the classical compositions that were recorded on the RCA Thesaurus label are the following:

- "Allegro" – Joseph Haydn Arr. John Serry Sr. (Accordion Quartette 1954)
- "The Golden Wedding (La Cinquantaine)" – Jean Gabriel-Marie Arr. John Serry Sr. (Accordion Quartette 1954)
- "Tango of Love" – John Serry Sr. Arr. John Serry Sr. (Accordion Quartette 1954)

== Popular compositions ==
Included among the popular songs recorded for RCA Thesaurus are the following:

- "Shine On, Harvest Moon" – Jack Noworth & Nora Bayes- Arr. John Serry Sr. (Sextette 1954)
- "My Melancholy Baby" – Ernie Burnett & George A. Norton – Arr. John Serry Sr. (Sextette 1954)
- "Singin' in the Rain" – Arthur Freed & Nacio Herb Brown – Arr. John Serry Sr. (Sextette 1954)
- "Nobody's Sweetheart" – Elmer Schoebel/Gus Kahn – Arr. John Serry Sr. (Sextette 1954)
- "Chicago" – Fred Fisher – Arr. John Serry Sr. (Sextette 1954)
- "If You Knew Susie" – Buddy DeSylva & Joseph Meyer -Arr. John Serry Sr. (Sextette 1954)
- "Somebody Stole My Gal" – Leo Wood – Arr. John Serry Sr. (Sextette 1954)
- "Ta-ra-ra Boom-de-ay" – Paul Stanley (composer) – Arr. John Serry Sr. (Sextette 1954)
- "Old McDonald" – Arr. John Serry Sr. (Sextette 1954)
- "Beer Barrel Polka" – Jaromir Vejvoda/Eduard Ingris Arr. John Serry Sr. (Sextette 1954)
- "I Love Louisa" - Arthur Schwartz/Howard Dietz – Arr. John Serry Sr. (Sextette 1954)
- "Oh You Beautiful Doll" – Seymour Brown/ Nat D. Ayer – Arr. John Serry Sr. (Sextette 1954)
- "Chinatown, My Chinatown" -William Jerome/Jean Schwartz – Arr. John Serry Sr. (Sextette 1954)

== Artistic ensembles ==
Included among the musical ensembles that recorded for RCA Thesaurus are the following:

=== The Bel-Cordions ===
- John Serry – First Accordionist/ Conductor/Arranger
- Louis Del Monte – Accordionist
- Alf Nystrom – Accordionist
- Ralph Vetro – Accordionist

=== Sammy Kaye Orchestra ===
- Sammy Kaye - conductor

=== Freddie Martin Orchestra ===
- Freddie Martin - conductor

=== Serry Sextette ===
- John Serry Sr. - First Acccordionist/ Conductor/Arranger
- Alf Nystrom - Accordionist
- Benny Mortell - Guitar
- Sammy Linner - Piano
- Doc Goldberg - Bass
- Harry Breur - Vibes/Marimba

=== Lawrence Welk Orchestra ===
- Lawrence Welk - conductor

== Archived recordings ==
- The John J. Serry Sr. Collection Archive at the University of Rochester's Eastman School of Music. Here on esm.rochester.edu

- The John J. Serry Sr. Collection at the Eastman School of Music's Sibley Music Library: Ruth T. Watanabe Special Collections contains an audio recording and original scores for musical arrangements of popular music in the RCA Thesaurus catalog as recorded at the RCA Victor Studios in New York City by the John Serry Sextette in 1954.
