= John Serry Sr. =

American concert accordionist, arranger, and composer (1915–2003)

John Serry
- John Serry in 1967
- Born: January 29, 1915; Brooklyn, United States
- Died: September 14, 2003 (aged 88); Long Island, United States
- Other name: John Serrapica
- Occupations: Accordionist, Organist, Educator, Composer
- Years active: 1930-2002

John Serry (born John Louis Serrapica; January 29, 1915 – September 14, 2003) was an American concert accordionist, arranger, composer, organist, and educator. He performed on the CBS Radio and Television networks and contributed to Voice of America's cultural diplomacy initiatives during the Golden Age of Radio. He also concertized on the accordion as a member of several orchestras and jazz ensembles for nearly forty years between the 1930s and 1960s.

External audio
- You may hear John Serry Sr. with Nestor Mesta Chayres and the Alfredo Antonini Orchestra playing the bolero "La Morena de mi Copla" in 1946; Here on DAHR

== Biography ==
Serry's career spanned over seven decades. As a proponent of Latin American music and the free-bass accordion, he performed as the piano accordionist on the radio music program Viva América, which was broadcast live to South America under the United States Department of State's Office of the Coordinator of Inter-American Affairs' cultural diplomacy initiative for Voice of America during World War II. Broadcasts of this show have been cited as helping to introduce Latin American music and the Mexican bolero to large audiences in the United States in the 1940s.

Serry performed with big bands, symphony orchestras, radio and television orchestras, and Broadway orchestras at the Radio City Music Hall, the Rainbow Room at Rockefeller Center (1935); the Starlight Roof at the Waldorf Astoria Hotel (1936–1937); the Palmer House in Chicago (1938); the Stevens Hotel in Chicago (1938); the Biltmore Hotel in Los Angeles (1938); Carnegie Hall with Alfredo Antonini conducting (1946); the Plaza Hotel (1940s); The Town Hall (1941–1942); the Waldorf Astoria Hotel's Wedgewood Room (1948), The Rajah Theatre (1953), the Ed Sullivan Theater (1959) for CBS television; the Empire Theater (New York) (1953); Phoenix Theatre (1956) and such New York cafe society nightspots as: El Morocco, El Chico and The Riviera in the 1930s. During the course of these performances he appeared under the musical direction of several noted conductors including: Alfredo Antonini, Mischa Borr, Percy Faith, Shep Fields, Mitch Miller and Andre Kostelanetz.

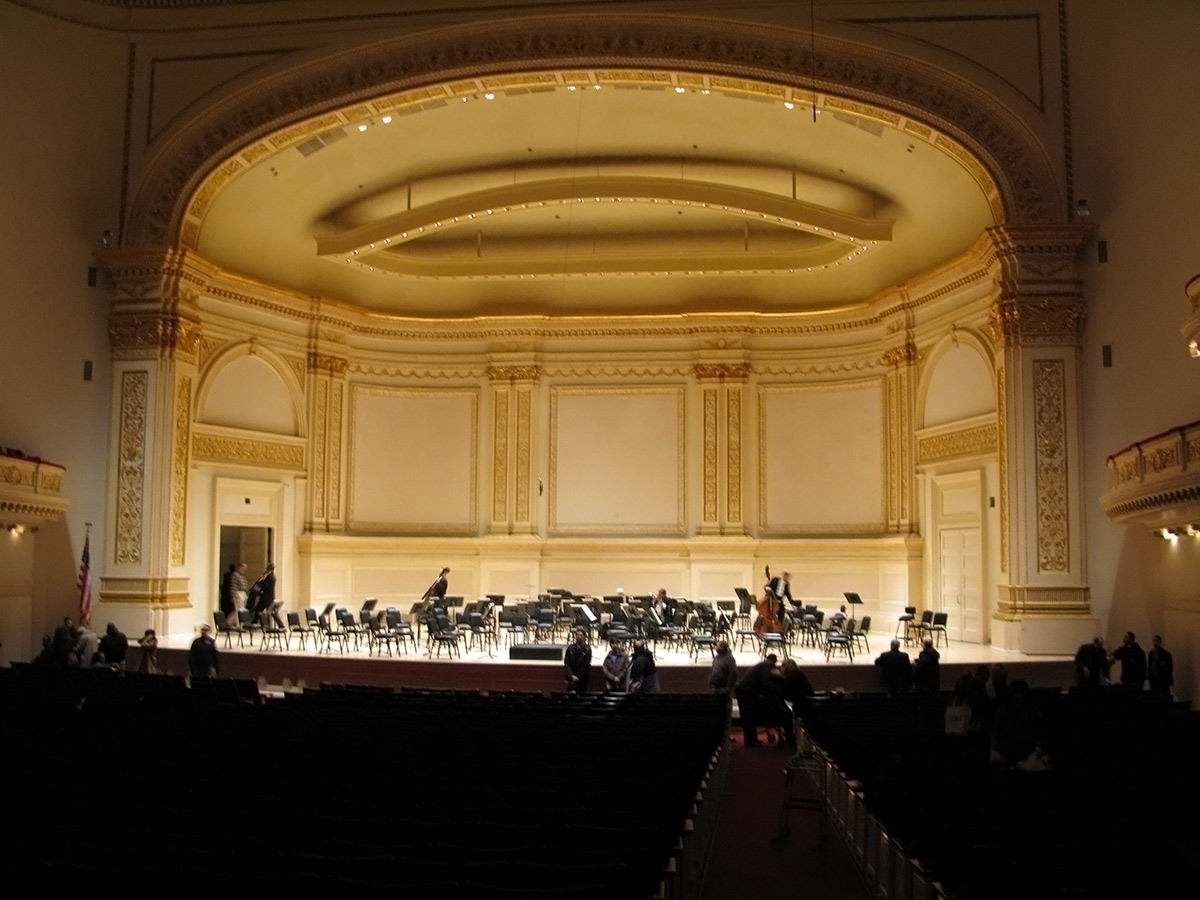
Carnegie Hall

Serry was born John Serrapica in Brooklyn, New York to Pasquale Serrapica and Anna Balestrieri, the fourth-born of thirteen siblings. His Italian father immigrated to America from Gragnano, Italy after passing through Ellis Island in 1904 and 1914. The family owned a grocery store after initially moving to Navy Street in 1905, and subsequently taking up residence on 18th Avenue in the Bensonhurst section. His formal musical education included studies with the accordionist Joseph Rossi from 1926 to 1929 at the Pietro Deiro School in New York. At the age of fifteen he performed live on the Italian radio station WCDA. By the age of nineteen, Serrapica was already enrolled as a member of the American Federation of Musicians in 1934. In addition, he undertook studies in piano and harmony with Albert Rizzi from 1929 to 1932 and in harmony and counterpoint with Gene Von Hallberg for two years. Von Hallberg served as a cofounder of the American Accordionists Association in 1938. Hallberg later appeared in the Magnante Quartet before an audience of three thousand concertgoers at Carnegie Hall in 1939 A lifelong friendship with the accordionist Louis Del Monte was established as a result of these studies. Del Monte awakened Serry's interest in Latin American music. Advanced studies in harmony and orchestration were completed under the instruction of the composer Robert Strassburg in the 1940s.

== Career ==
=== The 1930s: The big band era ===
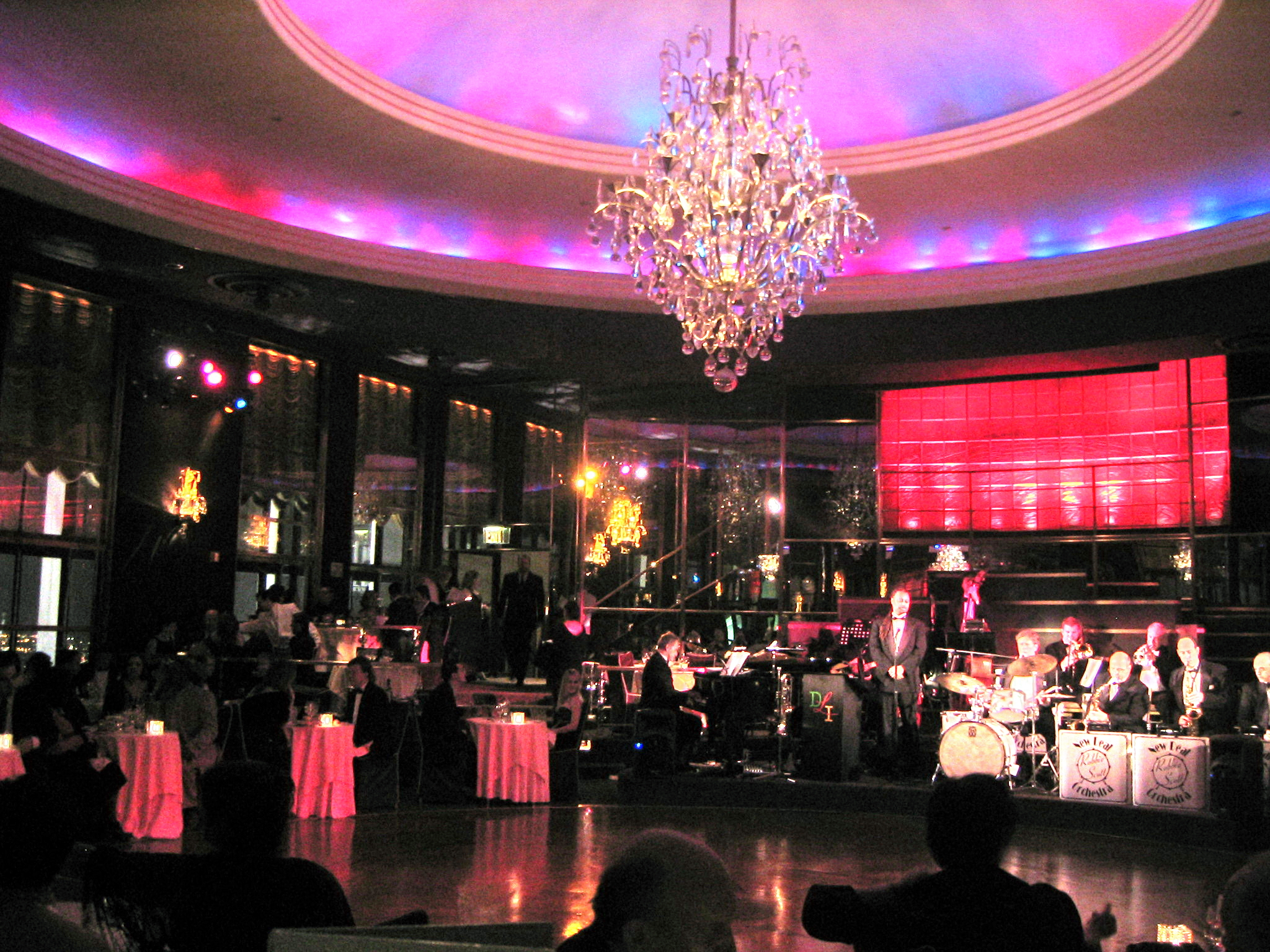
Rainbow Room in Rockefeller Center, New York City

The period from 1938 to 1960 has been described as a unique period of prestige for the accordion in the United States when it attained more widespread acceptance by the public as a "serious instrument" on the concert hall stage. At the age of sixteen, Serrapica had already performed as a soloist on the AM radio station WOV in New York City during several live broadcasts in 1931 following his debut on WCDA in 1930. With the help of Del Monte, in the 1930s Serry continued his professional career by making appearances with the Ralph Gomez Tango Orchestra at The Rainbow Room at the RCA Building in Rockefeller Center, leading to an extended engagement there in 1935. In the same year he also performed under the direction of Erno Rapee at the Radio City Music Hall in a production of "The Magazine Rack", a revue which was choreographed by Russell Merkert for the Rockettes. He also played with the Hugo Mariani Tango Orchestra at the Waldorf Astoria Hotel in New York and once again in Chicago with Frank Pruslin and Syd Fox (1936) and with Alfred Brito, a Cuban orchestra leader in New York (1936), and Misha Borr, conductor of the Waldorf-Astoria Orchestra. He appeared as a soloist for society functions at the Waldorf Astoria Hotel's Waldorf Towers and at its Starlight Roof with the Lester Lanin Orchestra. In addition, he performed regularly at clubs such as El Morocco, the Rainbow Room, El Chico, and the Riviera in New York City.

The "golden age of the accordion" continued to evolve in America from 1910 to 1960 and some piano accordionists suddenly enjoyed acceptance as performers within the best known dance bands, jazz ensembles and big band ensembles such as the Paul Whiteman orchestra. As the decade came to a close, Serry acquired a position with the jazz ensemble Shep Fields and His Rippling Rhythm during a nationwide tour which included live radio broadcasts from the Palmer House Hotel in Chicago, Illinois, and the Millennium Biltmore Hotel in Los Angeles, California, over the NBC network (1937–1938). These big band remote broadcasts used Zenith's Radiogran technology. In 1937, he also recorded the distinctive Shep Fields' theme song with the Shep Fields Rippling Rhythm Orchestra for Eli Oberstein on RCA Victor's Bluebird label (Victor, BS-017494, 1937). His performances as a member of the orchestra are also documented in the film The Big Broadcast of 1938 ("This Little Ripple Had Rhythm" and "Thanks for the Memory"), which won the Academy Award for Best Original Song in 1939. While touring with Shep Fields, he also recorded several popular songs of the time for Bluebird Records, including "With a Smile and a Song", "Whistle While You Work", and "Now It Can Be Told".

At the young age of only 23 in 1938, Serry was already collaborating on stage with several noted accordionists of the early 20th century including: Andy Arcari, Anthony Mecca, Domenic Mecca, Pietro Deiro and Joe Biviano. The six accordionists joined forces at the north ballroom of the legendary Stevens Hotel in Chicago for an "Accordion Jamfest" before an audience of over 1000 concertgoers in September 1938. The concert occurred soon after Andy Arcari's noted accordion recital at Philadelphia's Academy of Music in May 1938, where critics praise him for his brilliance. In a few short months both Biviano and the Mecca brothers would appear with Charles Magnante, Gene Von Hallberg and Abe Goldman to introduce the accordion in recital for the first time to an audience of classical music concertgoers in Carnegie Hall (April, 1939).

=== The 1940s: The golden age of radio ===
Serry married Julia Trafficante in the 1940s and moved to Nassau County, New York on Long Island to raise a family of four children which included John Serry Jr. The original family name of Serrapica was anglicized by John to Serry. He simultaneously undertook private studies with: Joscha Zade in piano (1945–1946); Arthur Guttow, an organist at the Radio City Music Hall (1946); and Robert Strassburg in Orchestration and Advanced Harmony (1948–1950). He specialized in the works of Gershwin, Debussy, and Ravel.

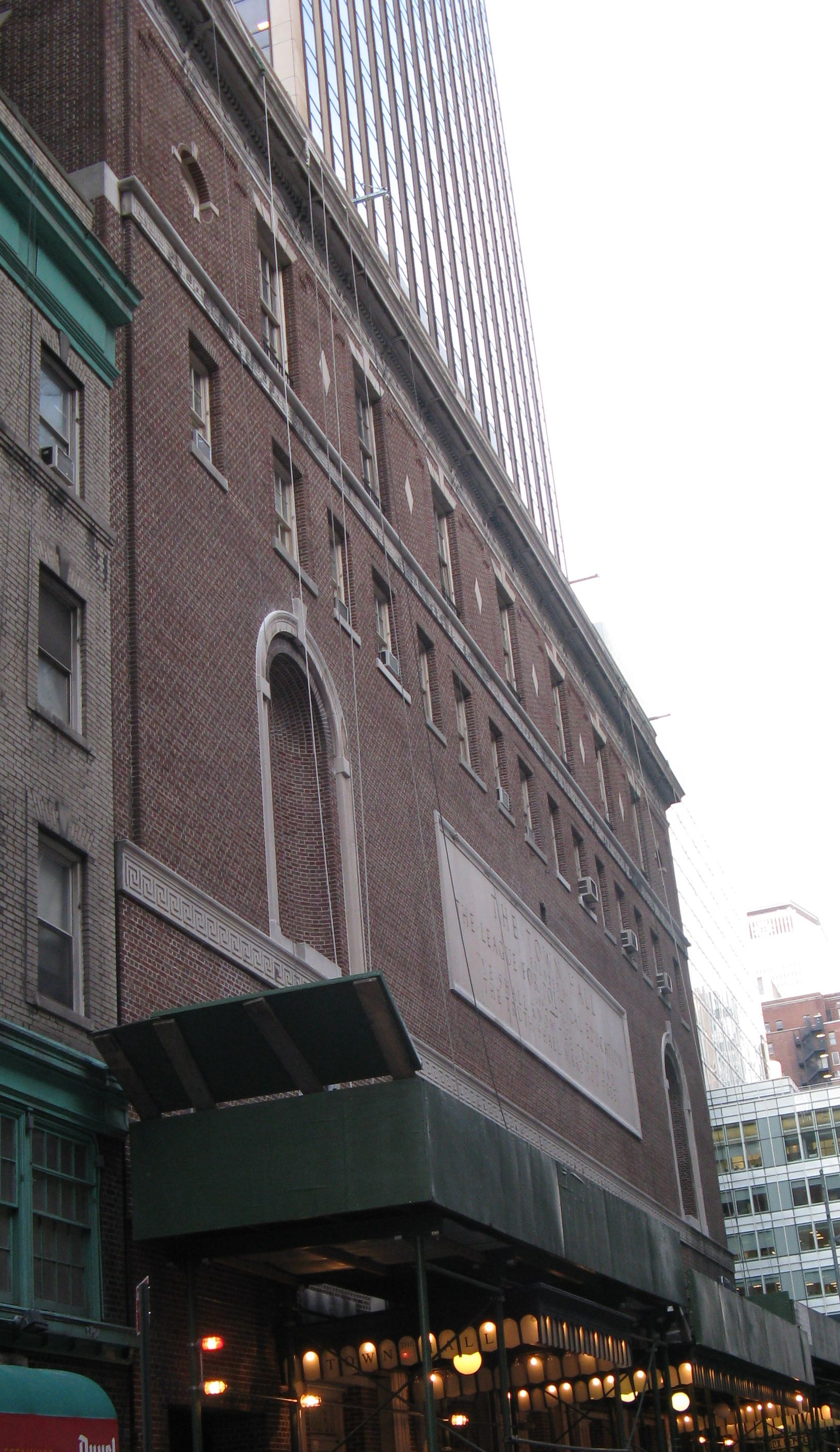
Town Hall in New York City

During the 1930s and 1940s many accordionists emerged as performers on American radio, the new mass entertainment medium of the time. Building upon his concert experiences of the 1930s, Serry entered the golden age of radio performing on the CBS radio network and assisted several concert artists in New York City including the French diseuse Marianne Oswald (aka Marianne Lorraine) in her English speaking debut of "One Woman Theatre" performing the poem Mr. Lincoln and His Gloves (by Carl Sandburg), Never Before (by Archibald MacLeish) and poems by Jean Cocteau and Jacques Prevert at Town Hall (1942). The concert was hosted by the Free World Association and presented with the patronage of Eleanor Roosevelt . This performance was praised in The Players Magazine – National Journal of Educational Dramatics as a "fresh experience and intriguing in its uniqueness." The New York Times described it as being skillfully presented. For ten years Serry performed as an original member of Alfredo Antonini's CBS Pan American Orchestra (1940–1949) on the Viva América program for the Department of State's Office of Inter-American Affairs (OCIAA) in support of its cultural diplomacy initiatives. He also worked with Antonini, Nestor Mesta Chayres and members of the New York Philharmonic in the Night of the Americas Concert gala at Carnegie Hall in 1946.

During this period, several international concert musicians also appeared on Viva America or recorded music with Antonini's Viva America Orchestra including: Terig Tucci (1942) Juan Arvizu (1940s); Nestor Mesta Chayres (1940s); Eva Garza (1940s); Elsa Miranda (1940s), Los Panchos Trio (1946), and Manuolita Arriola (1946) Under the supervision of Edmund Chester, these performances were beamed over CBS' Network of the Americas (La Cadena de las Americas) across the Latin America continent to over twenty countries and rebroadcast by the United States Office of War Information and the United States Armed Forces Radio Service. Performances by members of Antonini's CBS Pan American Orchestra on Viva America have been credited with helping to introduce Latin American music and the Mexican bolero to large audiences in the United States in the 1940s.

In addition, Serry also recorded examples of music unrelated to the bolero. During the 1940s he collaborated with the Mischa Borr Orchestra and the vocalist Sidor Belarsky to record several Russian and Ukrainian folk songs for Victor records including: "Dark Night" (Victor 26–5037, 1946) by Nikita Bogoslovsky, "Hobo Song" (aka "Mother") (Victor 26–5036, 1946) by Valery Zhelobinsky, "By the Cradle" (Victor 26–5035, 1946), "Katusha" (Victor 26–5035, 1946) by Hy Zaret In 1946 he also made a guest appearance as the "outstanding accordionist of the year" on Gordon Macrae's Skyline Roof broadcast under the direction of Archie Bleyer on the WABC-CBS network and as a guest on the Danny O'Neil Show. By 1948, he also appeared regularly in concert with Mischa Borr's Orchestra at the Waldorf Astoria Hotel's Wedgewood Room.

External image
- Photograph of John Serry on the CBS radio network circa 1940s in the John J. Serry Sr. Collection Archive. Here on Esm.rochester.edu

Serry recorded his work "Leone Jump" as a member of the Biviano Accordion & Rhythm Sextette with Tony Mottola on guitar and Angelo Delleria on accordion for Sonora Records in 1945. The album includes performances of "Little Brown Jug", Serry's arrangement of "Golden Wedding", "Swing Low Sweet Chariot", "That's a Plenty", and "The Jazz Me Blues". and has been preserved at the Smithsonian's National Museum of American History. His composition "Fantasy in F" was completed during this decade in 1946. The critic Henry Doktorski has described it as a "novelty piece" and likened it to Zez Confrey's composition "Dizzy Fingers". In 1946 he also appeared in the "Accordion World" concert at Manhattan Center with the accordionists Angello Dellairia and Joeseph Biviano. Later in 1949, the accordionist Joe Biviano collaborated with the RCA Victor Accordion Orchestra to record Serry's composition "Manhattan Hop" for RCA Victor. He also recorded several popular songs for Victor Records as a member of the noted Charles Magnante Accordion Band in 1941 including: "Clarinete Polka", '"Halli-Hallo- Halli", "Le Secret" and "Swing Me A Polka". Both Magnante and Biviano were cofounders of the American Accordionists' Association several years earlier in 1938.

By the end of the 1930s an "accordion craze" had swept the nation. Numerous accordion studios soon emerged within the major ethnic population centers of the East coast, as well as within the rural South and West with an estimated enrollment of over 35,000 students in 1938. As an educator, Serry founded and operated a music studio in Jamaica, Queens in New York City and Long Island, New York. Between 1945 and the late 1980s he provided instruction on accordion, piano, and organ. His pupils included Anthony Ettore, president of the American Accordionist's Association, Michael Torello, a composer and accordionist and Robert Davine, an accordionist and educator at the Lamont School of Music at the University of Denver as well as his son John Serry Jr. During the 1950s one of his students, Roy Appey, emerged as the first prize winner in a performance competition hosted by the American Accordionists' Association. In addition, Serry was invited to contribute to the annual series of Master Accordion Classes and seminars sponsored by the American Accordionists Association in New York City in August 2000. He also published several method books for his elementary, intermediate, and advanced grade students between 1945 and 1955. In addition, he took note of the limitations imposed by the Stradella bass system during performances of classical music. In an effort to circumvent these limitations, he designed and developed a working model of a free-bass system for the accordion during this decade. It incorporated dual keyboards for the soloist's left hand while incorporating two sets of reeds which were tuned in octaves. This gave the soloist access to a range of tones which exceeded three and one-half octaves.

=== The 1950s: Broadway and television ===
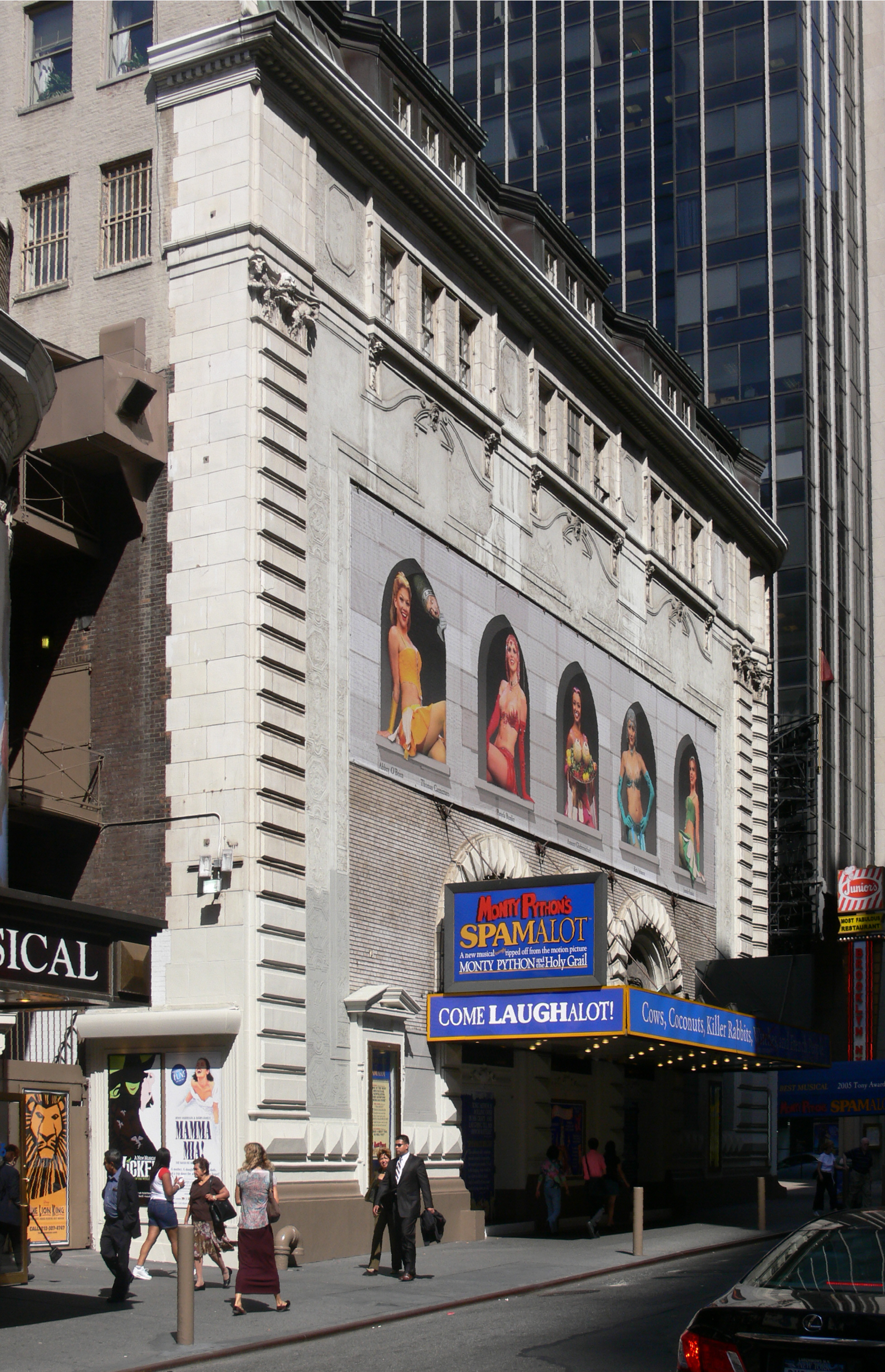
Shubert Theatre in New York City Shubert Theatre NYC

During the early days of network television in the 1950s, Serry performed at CBS as a staff member of the original CBS Orchestra (1949–1960) and an accompanist on several live network television programs including The Jackie Gleason Show in 1953, The Frank Sinatra Show in the 1950s, and on the prime time drama I Remember Mama in 1953 starring Peggy Wood. Following introductions by his young son Robert, he was also featured as a soloist on the talent show Live Like A Millionaire on the NBC radio network in 1951.

In 1951 he also arranged his compositions La Culebra and African Bolero for solo flute. He dedicated the scores to his close friend Julius Baker, who subsequently performed them on a demo recording. He also collaborated with the "Italian Troubadour" Nicola Paone in a series of recordings for RCA Victor. In the same year, his photograph was featured within an article about the accordion which was published by the journal International Musician – the official publication of the International Federation of Musicians, along with photographs of such noted accordionists as: Louis Del Monte, Pietro Frosini, Anthony Galla-Rini, Charles Magnante, Charles Nunzio, and Art Van Damme. By 1953, he was also photographed by the Bell accordion company as one of several leading accordion artists along with Tony Lavelli and Vince Geraci.

During this time he also performed under the musical direction of Andre Kostelanetz at CBS. As the first accordionist in the Serry Sextette, he recorded his own arrangements of several popular melodies and classical themes for the RCA Thesaurus electrical transcriptions catalog in 1954 during Ben Selvin's tenure as A & R Manager for RCA Victor. Performances on the radio also continued during this period and included: appearances as a member of the Magnante Accordion Quartet, on The Lucky Strike Hour, Waltz Time, and The American Melody Hour (1940s). He occasionally substituted for the quartet's founder Charles Magnante.

On the Broadway stage he performed under director Harold Clurman in a production of Arthur Laurents play The Time of the Cuckoo with Shirley Booth and Dino Di Luca. By 1953, he had also arranged music which was edited by Lawrence Welk and utilized in a course of study for the piano accordion by the U. S. School of Music, which was described years later as the oldest home study music school chartered by the Board of Regents in New York State with a total worldwide enrollment of over one million students. The school also utilized his photograph to encourage enrollment in its course of study for the piano accordion. In the same year, he appeared as a featured soloist at an accordion concert hosted at the Rajah Theatre in Reading, Pennsylvania. He also completed arrangements of popular songs for Seeburg's jukeboxes featuring three accordions, violins, vibes, guitar, bass, percussion and piano. Included among them were: I Get a Kick Out of You, Mimi, The One I Love, Swingin' Down the Lane, and Tico-Tico.

In 1956 Serry composed, arranged and performed several compositions for Dot Records (#DLP3024) with Al Caiola and Bernie Leighton on his album Squeeze Play during Billy Vaughn's tenure as music director at Dot Records. The production received a critical review as a new popular album in The Billboard in 1956 and was cited for establishing a beautiful soothing mood. The album was also critically reviewed in Cash Box magazine later that year. It features his original composition Garden In Monaco which is adapted from the theme of an ancient Italian serenade. Serry was applauded for establishing a wide variety of musical moods with grace, while simultaneously emphasizing a relaxed performance style. In 1958 several songs from the album were released once again in France by Versailles records (# 90 M 178) as Chicago Musette – John Serry et son Accordéon. Dot Records also released several songs from the album in Japan as part of a compilation recording including the John Serry Orchestra and the Billy Vaughn Orchestra (Ballroom in Dreamland, Dot #5006). During this time Serry also collaborated with Michael Danzi in an Off-broadway revival of A Month In The Country at the Phoenix Theatre (1956). These activities led to Serry's nomination to the "Who Is Who In Music International" in 1958. His advanced grade composition for accordion, American Rhapsody was completed and published during 1955. and his original compositions Garden in Monoaco (1955), Petite Tango (1955), Rockin the Anvil (1956) and Tango of Love (1955) were published within the BMI catalogue.

=== The 1960s: Liturgical organ music ===
In 1960, Serry emerged as a performer in one of the first stereo recordings of an accordion orchestra on a major label for Coral Records with noted instrumentalists, such as Joe Biviano, Carmen Carrozza, Angelo Di Pippo, and Eugene Ettore.(Pietro Deiro Presents the Accordion Orchestra, Coral, CRL-57323) The ensemble of sixteen accordionists utilized modified piano accordions to recreate the orchestral sounds of several instruments while performing classical works by Nikolai Rimsky-Korsakov, Carl Maria von Weber, Niccolò Paganini, and Pyotr Ilyich Tchaikovsky. The recording was cited in Billboard Magazine for its high level of musicality.

Several years later, Serry completed his Concerto For Free Bass Accordion in 1966 and subsequently transcribed it for piano in 2002. As the decade of the 1960s unfolded, however, the general public's interest in the accordion began to diminish in the United States while the popularity of rock music continued to grow. The ensuing revolution in popular music induced many young people to view the accordion as a "square relic" from their parents' generation which should be replaced by the electric guitar, electric piano and electronic organ. As a result, many established accordion studios either diversified or closed down entirely.

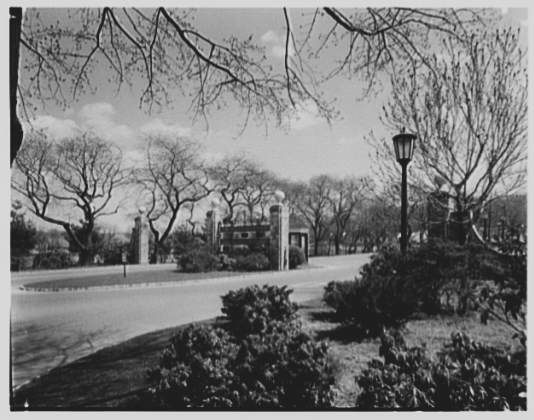
C.W. Post College, Brookville, Long Island. LOC gsc.5a29157

With this in mind, Serry devoted the remaining thirty-five years of his professional career to the performance of wedding music and liturgical music of the Jewish and Roman Catholic faiths as a freelance organist at the Interfaith Chapel of Long Island University C W Post Campus in Brookville, N.Y. (1968–2002). As more rabbis sought to unite couples of different faiths without first requiring conversions in the 1960s and 1970s, he collaborated with several clergymen of both the Jewish and Roman Catholic religious traditions, including: Rabbi Nathaniel Schwartz and the Rev. John Heinlein.

During this period, he also transcribed his composition Processional March (1951) from piano for use on the organ in 1968. In the years which followed, he composed several additional liturgical works for the choir of Notre Dame Parish on Long Island including: A Savior Is Born (1991, organ and solo voice), The Lord's Prayer (1992, organ and chorus) and Lamb of God (1994, for choir, flute and brass).

Serry died after a brief illness on Long Island, New York in 2003, age 88.

== Reviews ==
Several of John Serry's early live performances and recordings were reviewed by critics in such noted magazines as The Billboard, Cash Box and The Players Magazine – National Journal of Educational Dramatics. His recording with the Biviano Accordion and Rhythm Sextette for Sonora Records in 1945 (Accordion Capers) was reviewed by Billboard magazine, which noted that the music on the album was strictly for listening as opposed to dancing. While accompanying a dramatic vocalist he was cited for contributing to an intriguing and nuanced performance. His recording of Latin American music with the Alfredo Antonini Viva America Orchestra was described as "amongst the most attractive" by critics at The New Records in 1946.

In later years, Serry's recording of classical compositions by Nikolai Rimsky-Korsakov, Nicolo Paganini. Carl Maria von Weber and Pyotr Ilyich Tchaikovsky as a member of Pietro Deiro's Accordion Symphony Orchestra on the album Pietro Deiro Presents the Accordion Orchestra (Coral, CRL-57323 in 1960 was cited by critics in The Billboard for its" high musicality". A critic at High Fidelity observed that, "admirers of the accordion... should be enchanted by this near tour de force." A reviewer in the Catholic Digest also noted that his participation as an orchestral accordionist helped to create, "an entirely different sound...to simulate the various tonal ranges and colors found in a conventional orchestra." In 1956, his musical arrangements were also cited for using the accordion to, "convey a variety of musical moods with an easy-going grace... arranged for low-pressure listening." Above all else, he was applauded on his album Squeeze Play for utilizing the accordion to establish a beautiful, relaxed and soothing mood while avoiding a more common type of "show-off" performance.

== Works ==
=== Compositions and arrangements ===
External audio
- You may hear John Serry Sr. performing his "Leone Jump" with the Joe Biviano Accordion Rhythm Sextette and Tony Mottola in 1945; Here on Archive.org

His works include arrangements of popular songs for RCA Thesaurus and the following works:

- Desert Rumba (for accordion, 1939; publisher Antobal Music, 1951)
- Glissando (for accordion, publisher Biviano Music, 1942)
- Tarantella (for accordion, 1942; publisher Alpha Music, 1955)
- Valse (Composer Pytor Ilych Tchaikovsky (Opus 39 No. 8), arr. for accordion, publisher Viccas Music, 1946)
- Fantasy in F (for accordion, publisher Viccas Music, 1946)
- Invitation to Jive (for three accordions, guitar and bass, 1946)
- Consolation Waltz (for accordion, publisher O. Pagani & Bro., 1948)
- Uncle Charlie's Polka (for accordion, publisher O. Pagani Bro., 1948)
- The Bugle Polka (for accordion, publisher O. Pagani Bro., 1948)
- Leone Jump (for accordion, publisher Pietro Deiro, 1956)
- La Culebra (for accordion, 1950; arr. accordion & flute; 1950, arr. flute solo 1991; publisher Antobal Music, 1951)
- African Bolero (for accordion, 1950; arr. accordion & flute; 1950, arr. flute solo 1991; publisher Antobal Music, 1951)
- The Syncopated Accordionist (for accordion, publisher/editor Charles Colin, 1952)
- The First Ten Lessons for Accordion (for accordion, publisher Alpha Music, 1952)
- Accordion Method Books I, II, III, IV (for accordion, publisher Alpha Music, 1953)
- Rhythm-Airs for Accordion (editor John Serry, publisher Charles Colin & Bugs Bower, 1953)
- La Cinquantaine (m. Gabriel Marie, arr. accordion quartet, publisher Alpha Music, 1954)
- Allegro (m. Joseph Hayden, arr. accordion quartet, publisher Alpha Music, 1954)
- Top Ten Accordion Solos – Easy to Play (editor: John Serrapica, publisher Alpha Music, 1954)
- Junior Accordion Band Series (arr. accordion quartet, publisher Alpha Music, 1955)
- Tango Verde (m. Romero, arr. accordion quartet, publisher Alpha Music, 1955)
- Holiday in Rio (m. Terig Tucci, arr. accordion quartet, publisher Alpha Music, 1955)
- En Tu Reja (m. Romero, arr. accordion quartet, publisher Alpha Music, 1955)
- Tango of Love (for accordion quartet, publisher Alpha Music, 1955)
- Manolas (m. Escobar, arr. accordion quartet, publisher Alpha Music, 1955)
- Petite Tango (for accordion quartet, publisher Alpha Music, 1955)
- The Lost Tango for accordion, Words by Edward Steinfeld, 1956)
- Garden in Monaco (for accordion, publisher Alpha Music, 1956)
- Rockin' the Anvil (for accordion, publisher Alpha Music, 1956)
- Selected Accordion Solos (arr. accordion, publisher Alpha Music, 1956)
- Cocktails in Spain (for marimba, percussion, guitar, bass and organ, 1957)
- Spooky Polka (for accordion, publisher Alpha Music, 1957)
- Reeds in a Rush (for accordion, publisher Alpha Music, 1957)
- American Rhapsody (for accordion, publisher Rumbasher Alpha Music, 1957)
- Accordion Jazz Patterns Simplified (for accordion, publisher Charles Colin, 1958)
- I Get a Kick Out of You (m. Cole Porter, arr. violins, three accordions, vibes, guitar, bass, drums, piano, 195?)
- Mimi (m. Richard Rodgers, arr. violins, three accordions, vibes, guitar, bass, drums, and piano, 195?)
- The One I Love (m. Isham Jones, arr. violins, three accordions, vibes, guitar, bass, drums, and piano, 195?)
- Swingin' Down the Lane (m. Isham Jones, arr. violins, three accordions, vibes, guitar, bass, drums, and piano, 195?)
- Tico-Tico (m. Zequinha de Abreu, arr. three accordions, guitar, bass and piano, 195?)
- Processional for Organ (liturgical bridal march for organ, 1968)
- Falling Leaves (for piano, 1976)
- Elegy (for piano or organ, 1984 Rev. 1994)
- Three Songs of Love (for voice and piano, poems by David Napolin, 1986)
- A Savior Is Born (Christmas liturgical for organ & voice, 1991)
- Dreams Trilogy (for solo piano, 1991)
- The Lord's Prayer (liturgical Lord's Prayer for organ and chorus, 1992)
- Lamb of God (liturgical hymn for choir, flute and bass, 1994)
- Five Children's Pieces For Piano (for piano, 1996)

=== Advanced compositions ===
Serry's compositions in the symphonic jazz and classical music genres include:

- American Rhapsody (for accordion, 1955: published by Alpha Music 1957; transcribed for piano, 2002)
- Concerto For Free Bass Accordion (for accordion, 1966; transcribed for piano, 1995–2002, unpublished, a.k.a. Concerto in C Major for Bassetti Accordion)

== Discography ==
External audio
- You may hear selections from the album "Squeeze Play" (Dot Records,1956); Here on Listenbrainz.org

- Squeeze Play – Dot Records (catalogue #DLP-3024) (1956)
- RCA Thesaurus – RCA Victor Transcriptions series of over thirty works. John Serry Sr. as a contributing arranger and soloist with The Bel-Cordions accordion Sextette ensemble and Ben Selvin – Music Director (1954).

List of musical arrangements: Allegro – Joseph Haydn, The Golden Wedding( La Cinquantaine) – Jean Gabriel-Marie, Tango of Love – John Serry Sr., Shine On, Harvest Moon – Jack Noworth & Nora Bayes, My Melancholy Baby – Ernie Burnett & George A. Norton, Singin' in the Rain – Arthur Freed & Nacio Herb Brown, Nobody's Sweetheart – Elmer Schoebel/Gus Kahn, Chicago – Fred Fisher, If You Knew Susie – Buddy DeSylva & Joseph Meyer, Somebody Stole My Gal – Leo Wood, Ta-ra-ra Boom-de-ay – Paul Stanley (composer), Old McDonald – children's music, Beer Barrel Polka – Jaromir Vejvoda/Eduard Ingris, I Love Louisa – Arthur Schwartz/Howard Dietz, Oh You Beautiful Doll – Seymour Brown/ Nat D. Ayer, Chinatown, My Chinatown -William Jerome/Jean Schwartz

- Ballroom in Dreamland – Dot Records (catalogue # 5006) – a compilation album released in Japan featuring performances of Jazz, Latin and Classical music by the John Serry Orchestra and the Billy Vaughn Orchestra.
- Pietro Deiro Presents the Accordion Orchestra – Coral Records (catalogue #CRL-57323) – as a member of an orchestra of sixteen accordionists interpreting the sounds of a traditional orchestra in performances of transcriptions from classical music under the direction of Joe Biviano.*:List of musical selections: Danse des Bouffons – Nikolai Rimsky-Korsakov, Beguine di Roma – Joe Biviano, Invitation to the Dance – Carl Maria von Weber, La Cumparsita – musical arrangement by Joseph Biviano, La Chasse – Niccolo Paganini, Danse Chinoise – Pyotr Ilyich Tchaikovsky, Three Blind Mice – musical arrangement by Joseph Biviano, Danse de Marlitens – Pyotr Ilyich Tchaikovsky, Walse de Fleur – Pyotr Ilyich Tchaikovsky, The Flight of the Bumble Bee – Nikolai Rimsky-Korsakov, The Rooster – Joe Biviano, Careless one cha-cha-cha – Joe Biviano

External audio
- You may hear John Serry performing "Lamento Gitano" with Nestor Mesta Chayres and the Alfredo Antonini Orchestra in 1946; Here on DAHR

- Accordion Capers – Sonora Records (catalogue # MS 476) – as a member of the Biviano Accordion & Rhythm Sextette. (1947)List of musical selections: Little Brown Jug- Joseph Eastburn Winner, The Golden Wedding (La Cinquantaine) – Jean Gabriel-Marie, Leone Jump – John Serry, Swing Low, Sweet Chariot- Wallace Willis, That's a Plenty – Lew Pollack, Scotch Medley – folk music, The Jazz Me Blues – Tom Delaney
- Latin American Music – Alpha Records (catalogue # 12205A, 12205B, 12206A, 12206B) – as a member of the Viva America Orchestra – Conductor Alfredo Antonini (1946)List of recordings: Caminito de tu Casa – Julio Alberto Hernández, Chapinita – Miguel Sandoval, Adios Mariquita Linda – Marcos A. Jimenez, Mi Nuevo Amor, La Zandunga – Andres Gutierrez/Maximo Ramo Ortiz, La Mulata Tomasa – Lazaro Quintero, Tres Palabras – Osvaldo Farres, Noche de ronda – Augustin Lara
- Granada – Decca Records (catalogue # 23770A) – as a member of the Alfredo Antonini Orchestra with the lyric tenor Nestor Mesta Chayres (1946)
- Chiquita Banana – Alpha (catalogue # 1001A) – as a member of the Alfredo Antonini Orchestra, conductor Alfredo Antonini, vocalist Elsa Miranda (1946)

External audio
- You may hear John Serrapica performing "Clarinet Polka" with the Charles Magnante Accordion Band in 1941; Here on DAHR
- John Serry performing "Dark Night" with Sido Belarsky and the Mischa Borr Orchestra in 1946; Here on library.wisc.edu

- Leone Jump – Sonora Records (catalogue # 3001 B) – as a member of the Biviano Accordion & Rhythm Sextette. (1945)
- By the Cradle – Victor Records (catalogue # 26-5035) – accordionist in the Mischa Borr Orchestra, vocalist Sidor Belarsky (1946)
- Katusha – Victor Records (catalogue # 26-5035) – accordionist in the Mischa Borr Orchestra, vocalist Sidor Belarsky (1946)
- Hobo Song – Victor Records (catalogue # 26-5036 ) – accordionist in the Mischa Borr Orchestra, vocalist Sidor Belarsky (1946)
- Dark Night – Victor Records (catalogue # 26-5037) – accordionist in the Mischa Borr Orchestra, vocalist Sidor Belarsky (1946)
- Clarinet Polka – Bluebird (catalogue # B-11294-A) – John Serry (aka John Serrapica) as a member of the Charles Magnante Accordion Band (1941).
- Swing Me a Polka – Victor (matrix # BS-067555) – John Serry (aka John Serrapica) as a member of the Charles Magnante Accordion Band (1941).
- Le Secret – Victor (matrix # BS-067556) – John Serry (aka John Serrapica) as a member of the Charles Magnante Accordion Band (1941).
- Halli-Hallo-Halli – Victor (matrix # BS-067556) – John Serry (aka John Serrapica) as a member of the Charles Magnante Accordion Band (1941.

External audio
- You may hear John Serry Sr. with Los Panchos Trio and the Alfredo Antonini Viva America Orchestra performing a chilian cueca dance "La Palma" circa 1946 Here on Archive.org
- John Serry with Luis G. Roldan and the Orquesta CBS Pan-Americana C.B.S. performing "Tres Palabras" Here on ucl.edu
- John Serry with Luis G. Roldan and the Orquesta CBS Pan-Americana C.B.S. performing "Esta Noche Ha Pasado" Here on ucla.edu

- Tres Palabras and Esta Noche Ha Pasado – Columbia Records (catalogue # 6201-X) – as a member of the CBS Pan American Orchestra – Conductor Alfredo Antionini, Vocalist Luis G. Roldan (194?)List of songs: Tres Palabras – Osvaldo Farres, Esta Noche Ha Pasado – M. Sabre Marroquin
- Asi and Somos Diferentes – Columbia Records (catalogue # 6202-X) – as a member of the CBS Pan American Orchestra – Conductor Alfredo Antonini, Vocalist Luis G. Roldan (194?)List of songs: Asi – María Grever, Somos Diferentes – Pablo Beltran Ruiz
- La Palma and Rosa Negra – Pilotone Records (catalogue # 5067 & # 5069) – as a member of Alfredo Antonini's Viva America Orchestra, Vocalists Los Panchos Trio (194?)List of songs: La Palma (Chilian cueca dance), Rosa Negra (Conga)
- El Bigote de Tomas and De Donde – Columbia Records (Catalogue # 36666) – as a member of the CBS Tipica Orchestra conducted by Alfredo Antonini with tenor Juan Arvizu (194?) List of musical selections: El Bigote de Tomas – Valie, De Donde – María Grever
- Mi Sarape and Que Paso? – Columbia Records (catalogue # 36665) – as a member of the CBS Tipica Orchestra conducted by Alfredo Antonini with tenor Juan Arvizu (194?)List of musical selections: Mi Sarape – María Grever, Que Paso? – Cortazar
- Viva Sevilla! and Noche de Amor – Columbia records (catalogue # 36664) – as a member of the CBS Tipica Orchestra conducted by Alfredo Antonini with tenor Juan Arvizu (194?) Musical selections: Viva Sevilla! – Lavidad/Delmoral, Noche de Amor – Tchaikovsky arr.Arvizu/Antonini

External audio
- You may hear John Serry and the Shep Fields Orchestra performing "With A Smile and A Song" in 1937; Here on DAHR
- You may hear John Serry and the Shep Fields Orchestra performing the fox trot "There's a New Moon Over the Old Mill" in 1937; Here on DAHR
- You may hear John Serry performing "Whistle While You Work" with the Shep Fields Orchestra in 1937; Here on DAHR
- You may hear John Serry and the Shep Fields Orchestra performing "In the Merry Month of May" Here on DAHR

- Shep Fields and His Rippling Rhythm Orchestra – Bluebird Records – as the accordionist (1938)List of recordings 1938: A Stranger in Paree (#B-7566), I Wanna Go Back to Bali (B#7566) – Harry Warren/Al Dubin, Cathedral in the Pines (#B-7553) – Charles Kenny/Nick Kenney, Somewhere with Somebody Else (#B-7555), That Feeling Is Gone (#B-7555), Good Evenin', Good Lookin (#B-7553), My Walking Stick (#B-7592), Havin' Myself a Time (#B-7581) – Ralph Rainger/Leo Robin, Fare Thee Well, Annie Laurie (#B-7581), This Time It's Real (#B-7579), If It Rains – Who Cares? (#B-7579), Now It Can Be Told (#B-7592) – Irving Berlin, I've Got a Pocketful of Dreams (#B-7581), In Any Language (#B-7604), Where in the World (#B-7604), Any Little Girl, That's a Nice Little Girl, Is the Right Little Girl for Me (#B-7606) – Thomas J. Gray/Fred Fisher, In the Merry Month of May (#B-7606) – Ed Haley, Don't Let That Moon Get Away (#B-7697) – Johnny Burke (lyricist)/James V. Monaco, An Old Curiosity Shop (#B-10056) – Sam Coslow, Guy Wood, Abner Silver
- Shep Fields and His Rippling Rhythm Orchestra – Bluebird Records – as the accordionist (1937)List of recordings 1937: With a Smile and a Song (#B-7343) – Frank Churchill/Larry Morey, Whistle While You Work (#B-7343) – Frank Churchill/Larry Morey, It's Wonderful (#B-7333), I'm the One Who Loves You (#B-7333), There's a New Moon Over the Old Mill (#B-7355) – Allie Wrubel/Herb Magidson, Goodnight, Angel (#B-7355) Allie Wrubel/Herb Magidson, Bob White (Whatcha Gonna Swing Tonight?) (#B-7345) – Bernard Hanighen/Johnny Mercer
- Chicago Musette-John Serry and His Accordion – Versailles (catalogue # 90 M 178) released in France (1958) List of musical arrangements: Rock and Roll Polka – Mort Lindsey/George Skinner, My Heart Cries for You- Percy Faith/Carl Sigman, Secret Love -Paul Webster/Sammy Fain, Granada – Agustín Lara

== Filmography ==
- The Big Broadcast of 1938 (1938) – as himself, performing with the Shep Fields Orchestra.

== Invention ==
Serry was granted a patent in 1966 by the United States Patent Office for his design of a protective shield for collapsible toothpaste tubes (US Patent #US3269604). A patent for the same design was also granted to him by the Canadian Patent Office in 1966 (Serial #998,449 May 14, 1966).

Earlier in his career in the 1940s, Serry also designed a working model for a Free Bass accordion which incorporated two independent sets of reeds through the use of dual keyboards for the left hand. The reeds were tuned in octaves in order to provide access to a total tonal range of three and a half octaves for performers of classical music. In addition, direct independent access to the dual keyboards was provided for the performer's thumb and remaining fingers of the left hand.

== Publications ==
- Serry, John (1935), "The Danzon, The Bolero, The Rumba – The Substitute American Rhythm Emphasis Laid on Going Native", Accordion News
- Serry, John (1935), "Training: Reading From Piano Scores. Stumbling Cues. Avoid Time Wasters", Accordion News
- Serry, John (1935), "Orchestrations: A Study in Rhythm, Tango Chosen For Its Diversity, The Break, How the Accordion Should be Played in the Orchestra", Accordion News
- Serry, John (1936), "Chorus", Accordion News
- Serry, John (November 1937), "Accordions & Orchestras: Past Present & Future", Accordion World.
- Serry, John (March 1939), "Those Neglected Basses", Accordion World.
- Serry, John (1947), "What's Wrong With The Accordion", Accordion World.
- Serry, John (1961), "Jazz And The Student Accordionist", Accordion World.
- Serrapica, John (1952), The Syncopated Accordionist, Charles Colin.

== Archived works ==
- The John J. Serry Sr. Collection Archive University of Rochester Eastman School of Music. Here on esm.rochester.edu

- The John J. Serry Sr. Collection at the Eastman School of Music's Sibley Music Library within the Ruth T. Watanabe Special Collections Department contains selected examples of Serry's original compositional scores, arrangements, LP recordings, reel to reel recording tapes of his performances, biographical articles and other biographical reference materials which have been donated for archival purposes to benefit both researchers and students. The archive includes a copy of his album Squeeze Play and an audio recording of his arrangements for RCA Thesaurus. Researchers may contact the staff archivist directly for further assistance in obtaining copies of scores or reviewing LP recordings.
- The Discography of American Historical Recordings catalog at the University of California at Santa Barbara includes several of the master recordings of Serry's performances with the Shep Fields Rippling Rhythm Jazz Orchestra in New York City (1937–1938) and his recordings with the Charles Magnante Accordion Band (1941) which are accessible online via audio streaming.
- The Smithsonian Institute's National Museum of American History contains Serry's recording of his "Leone Jump" and other classic jazz favorites with the guitarist Tony Mottola and accordionists Joe Biviano, Tony Colucci and Angelo Dellaira in 1946 within its permanent collection (Sonora, MS-476).

== Professional affiliations ==
Serry was an active member of the BMI, SESAC, American Federation of Musicians (Local #802) (1933–2003), and The American Guild of Organists. For a brief period he served as a charter member of the American Accordionists Association (1938). He pursued professional musical studies with: Joseph Rossi (accordion, 1926–1929); Albert Rizzi (piano and harmony, 1929–1932); Gene Von Hallberg (counterpoint and harmony, 1933–1934) (a founder of the American Accordionists Association); Jascha Zade (piano, 1945–1946); Arthur Guttow (organ, 1946), and Robert Strassburg (piano, advanced harmony, and orchestration, 1948–1950).

== See also ==
- Accordion music genres
- Bolero
- Easy listening
- Free-bass system
- Secular Jewish music
- Wedding music
