= Squeeze Play (album) =

Studio album by John Serry
- Released: 1956, New York City
- Recorded: 1956, New York City
- Genre: Pop, classical, instrumental
- Length: 30:14
- Label: Dot Records
- Producer: Ben Selvin

John Serry chronology
RCA Thesaurus - RCA Victor Transcriptions (1954)	Squeeze Play (1956)	Pietro Deiro Presents the Accordion Orchestra (1960)

Singles from Squeeze Play
- 1. "Chicago Musette - John Serry et Son Accordéon" Released: 1958 France

External audio
- You may hear John Serry performing his arrangements of Granada and Secret Love from the album Squeeze Play as released on Chicago Musette: John Serry et son Accordéon in 1958 Here on Gallica.BnF
- You may hear songs from the album Squeeze Play (Dot,1956) Here on listenbrainz.org

Squeeze Play is an Ultra High Fidelity monaural phonographic album (33 1/3 RPM) which was released on the Dot Records label in 1956 (DLP-3024) featuring John Serry It includes an original composition by Serry, classical works, and popular music of the era. Ben Selvin serves as the musical director/producer for the album. The works were arranged by Serry and performed with his ensemble featuring two accordions, piano, guitar, bass, drum, vibes, and marimba.

The liner notes of the album claim that

[T]he tunes that Mr. Serry has so expertly recorded are craftily arranged, superbly performed. Each tune is a small production within itself... and look at the variety of material...What Serry has done here is present the accordion as the melodic instrument that is capable of producing beautiful sounds in a legato style...Serry has placed the accent on interpretation and in doing so has come up with twelve sparkling performances that provide a delightful contrast to the much overdone virtuoso style of accordion playing.

Squeeze Play Featuring the Dynamic Accordion of John Serry (Media notes).

The album was cited in a critical review of new popular albums of 1956 in The Billboard magazine and was described as providing beautiful performances which created a soothing mood, in contrast to common entertainment. The album was also reviewed in The Cash Box magazine later that year. Serry's performances were noted for establishing a variety of musical moods with grace while also emphasizing a relaxed performance style.

In 1958 selected songs from the album were released in France by Versailles records (#90 M 1788) as Chicago Musette - John Serry et son accordéon. Dot Records also released several songs from the album in Japan as part of a compilation recording including performances of easy listening music by both the John Serry Orchestra and the Billy Vaughn Orchestra (Ballroom in Dreamland, Dot #5006).

A copy of the album and the composer's original orchestral score have been donated for archival purposes to the Eastman School of Music's Sibley Music Library within the Ruth T. Watanabe Special Collections Department for the benefit of researchers and students (John J. Serry Sr. Collection).

== Track listing ==
Side One

1. "Garden in Monaco" (Composer - John Serry Sr.) – 2:58
2. "Terry's Theme" - (Charles Chaplin) – 2:39
3. "When My Dreamboat Comes Home" - (Cliff Friend, Dave Franklin) – 2:31
4. "Blue Bell" - (S. Stanley) – 2:15
5. "Rockin' The Anvil" - theme by Giuseppe Verdi (See Anvil Chorus)/ music John Serry Sr. – 2:35
6. "Secret Love" - (Paul Francis Webster, Sammy Fain) – 2:18

Side Two

1. "Granada"- (Agustín Lara) – 3:14
2. "Side by Side" - (Harry M. Woods) – 2:18
3. "My Heart Cries for You" - (Percy Faith, Carl Sigman) – 1:58
4. "Hawaiian Night" - (Hans Carste, Francis Vincente) – 2:37
5. "Button Up Your Overcoat" - (Buddy DeSylva, Lew Brown, Ray Henderson) – 2:14
6. "Rock 'N' Roll Polka" - (Mort Lindsey, George Skinner) – 2:37

== Ensemble artists ==
- John Serry Sr. - Lead Accordion/Conductor
- Alf Nystrom - Accordion
- Bernie Leighton - Piano
- Al Caiola - Guitar
- Frank Carroll - Bass
- Charlie Roeder - Drums
- Harry Breur - Vibes/Marimba

== Archived recordings ==
External image
- The John J. Serry Sr. Collection Archive University of Rochester - Eastman School of Music. Here on esm.rochester.edu

- The John J. Serry Sr. Collection - within The University of Rochester's Eastman School of Music Sibley Music Library: Special Collections contains a copy of the album Squeeze Play (DLP-3024, 1954) for the benefit of researchers and students.
