= Cliff Friend =

American songwriter (1893–1974)

- Born: October 1, 1893
- Origin: Cincinnati, Ohio, US
- Died: June 27, 1974 (aged 80) Las Vegas, Nevada, US
- Occupation: Songwriter
- Instrument: Piano
- Formerly of: Tin Pan Alley

Cliff Friend (October 1, 1893 – June 27, 1974) was an accomplished American songwriter and pianist. A member of Tin Pan Alley, Friend co-wrote several hits including "Lovesick Blues", "My Blackbirds Are Bluebirds Now" and "The Merry-Go-Round Broke Down", also known as the theme song to the Looney Tunes cartoon series.

== Early life ==
Friend was born on October 1, 1893, in Cincinnati. His father was first violinist with the Woods Theater Orchestra. He studied at the Cincinnati Conservatory of Music with the aim of becoming a concert pianist, until a three-year bout of tuberculosis. He met Harry Richman while working on vaudeville shows, and the two moved to Los Angeles, where they befriended Buddy De Sylva and Al Jolson.

== Career ==
Jolson encouraged Friend and Richman to move to New York City, where they became part of Tin Pan Alley. Friend collaborated with leading songwriters Dave Franklin, Abel Baer, Lew Brown, Irving Caesar, Sidney Clare, Billy Rose and Charles Tobias, and Jolson assisted Friend by placing songs in the musicals he was acting in, including The Passing Show and Bombo.

Friend's first hit was in 1923, called "You Tell Her - I Stutter" and co-written with Billy Rose, it was recorded by The Happiness Boys. Over the next 15 years Friend also co-wrote "Lovesick Blues", "June Night", "Then I'll Be Happy", "(Oh) If I Only Had You", "A Night in June (Beneath the Moon)", "My Blackbirds are Bluebirds Now", "It Goes Like This", "You're a Real Sweetheart", "Bashful Baby", "I Want to Sing About You", "It's Great to Be In Love", "Let's Have a Party", "Don't Let Temptation Turn You Around", "The Sweetest Music This Side of Heaven", "When My Dream Boat Comes Home" (as recorded by John Serry Sr. on Squeeze Play in 1956), "You've Got Me In the Palm of Your Hand", "Out Where the Blue Begins" and "The Merry-Go-Round Broke Down". "The Merry-Go-Round Broke Down" was used as the theme song in the Warner Bros. Looney Tunes cartoon series.

Cliff Friend died on June 27, 1974, aged 80, in Las Vegas.
