= Golden Wedding =

Golden Wedding (or Golden wedding) refers to the "golden" (or 50th) wedding anniversary

It may also refer to:

- "The Golden Wedding" (La Cinquantaine), a piece of music composed by Jean Gabriel Marie in 1887.
- La Cinquantaine, a 1771 play by Desfontaines-Lavallée.
