= Dave Franklin =

American songwriter (1895–1970)

- Born: September 28, 1895
- Origin: New York, New York, U.S.
- Died: February 2, 1970 (aged 74)
- Occupation: Songwriter
- Instrument: Piano

Dave Franklin (September 28, 1895 – February 2, 1970) was an accomplished American songwriter and pianist. A member of Tin Pan Alley, Franklin co-wrote "The Merry-Go-Round Broke Down", which was adopted as the theme song to the Looney Tunes cartoon series. His primary collaborator was lyricist Cliff Friend. His other collaborators included Al Dubin, Isham Jones, Irving Taylor. Franklin worked in vaudeville and night clubs in the U.S. and Europe. According to The Complete Encyclopedia of Popular Music and Jazz, 1900–1950, by Roger Kinkle, he left school at 13 to work as a pianist in a publishing house. Some of his songs were recorded by Glen Gray, Isham Jones, Guy Lombardo and Frankie Trumbauer.

== Shows and films ==
- Paramount on Parade
- That's Right—You're Wrong

== Songs ==
=== Unknown date ===
- Cincinnati Rag
- If I Had a Magic Carpet
- Rhythm of the Tambourine (in 1929 Broadway Scandals)

=== 1930 ===
- I'm Isidore the Toreador

=== 1934 ===
- Blue Lament
- I Ain't Lazy, I'm Just Dreaming
- It's Funny to Everyone But Me

=== 1935 ===
- Give a Broken Heart a Break
- I Woke Up Too Soon

=== 1936 ===
- Breakin' in a New Pair of Shoes
- I Hope Gabriel Likes My Music
- When My Dreamboat Comes Home

=== 1937 ===
- Everything You Said Came True
- Never Should Have Told You
- The Merry-Go-Round Broke Down
- Two Dreams Got Together
- You Can't Stop Me From Dreaming

=== 1938 ===
- I Come From a Musical Family
- I Must See Annie Tonight
- There's a Brand New Picture in My Picture Frame
- Who Do You Think I Saw Last Night?

=== 1939 ===
- Happy Birthday to Love
- I'm Building a Sailboat of Dreams
- The Concert in the Park
- You Don't Know How Much You Can Suffer

=== 1941 ===
- El vals del aniversario

=== 1942 ===
- The Penny Arcade

=== 1943 ===
- It's Like Old Times

=== 1944 ===
- By The Old Corral

=== 1945 ===
- Lily Belle

=== 1946 ===
- One-zy Two-zy

=== 1947 ===
- Dreamer's Holiday
- Lone Star Moon

=== 1949 ===
- California Orange Blossom
- The Golden Sands of Hawaii

=== 1950 ===
- A Good Time Was Had By All
- A Man Wrote a Song
- You Are My Love

=== 1954 ===
- Still You'd Break My Heart

=== 1958 ===
- The Voice in My Heart

== Audio recordings of songs ==
1956– John Serry Sr. recorded When My Dreamboat Comes Home for Dot Records (See Squeeze Play (album))

1956 Fats Domino recorded When My Dreamboat Comes Home for Imperial Records (See Fats Domino Rock and Rollin')

1965 Fats Domino re-recorded When My Dreamboat Comes Home for ABC-Paramount Records
