= Carmen Carrozza =

Italian-American accordionist

External image
- Photograph of Carmen Carrozza, Joseph Biviano with accordionists Anthony Ettore, Anthony Mecca and composers Paul Creston, Virgil Thomson receiving awards at ASCAP circa 1961-1970; Here on digital.library.umkc.edu

Carmen Carrozza (July 20, 1921 – June 17, 2013) was one of America's premier concert accordionists, before he retired from performing after suffering a stroke. He was born in the village of Solano in Reggio di Calabria, Calabria, Italy, in 1921 and emigrated to the United States of America with his family at age 9, settling with them in Chappaqua, New York. He played piano and violin, but soon became enamored with the accordion's flexibility, how it could fit perfectly into an orchestra or sound like an orchestra itself.

Carrozza studied under Pietro Deiro who was one of the pioneers of the accordion in the United States. He has appeared as soloist with the Boston Pops Orchestra under the direction of Arthur Fiedler, the Cincinnati Symphony Orchestra, Buffalo Philharmonic Orchestra, and the National Symphony Orchestra (United States) at Kennedy Center in Washington, D.C. He has also appeared with the New York Philharmonic under the direction of Andre Kostelanetz, premiering in 1975 the Rubaiyat of Omar Khayyam, Op. 308, written by Alan Hovhaness and narrated by Douglas Fairbanks Jr. in Washington, D.C., and for former New York City Mayor John Lindsay in New York. He has concertized throughout Europe and was presented with a gold medal in Italy after an outstanding performance at the Teatro di Pavia. One of the high points in Carrozza's career was a concert in The Town Hall in New York City where he performed all original accordion works by many outstanding American composers including Robert Russell Bennett, Paul Creston, Virgil Thomson and many others.

In the early 1960s, Carrozza also collaborated with Pietro Deiro Jr and several other musical colleagues under the direction of the accordionist Joe Biviano in an all-accordion symphonic orchestra for a recording of classical music on the Coral Records label - Pietro Deiro Presents the Accordion Orchestra (CRL-57323, 1960). The album received critical acclaim as "a novelty of high musicality". The liner notes on the album indicate that Carrozza was joined by:

{S]ome of the most outstanding accordion talents in the country...Tony Mecca...Joseph and Catherine Manzi...Eugene Ettore...John Serry...Orlando Di Girolamo...Alfonzo Veltr...John Blowers...Ruby Jamis...Angelo Di Pippo...Val Dennis...Tony Ettore...Joseph Fezza...Peter Giradi...Robert Skilling..

Carrozza retired from touring in the 1980s, but in the summer of 1994 he was called back to the road, playing three weeks of festivals with Jörgen Sundeqvist in Sweden.

Carrozza was president of the American Accordionists' Association (AAA), a national organization dedicated to the development of the accordion. He continued to promote the accordion through educational workshops at schools, college and private music studios until his death. In addition, he was the director of the Northern Westchester School of Yorktown, New York. Until his death, he resided in Thornwood, New York, with his wife Jean. He had two grown children, Carmen and Marianne.
