= Anvil Chorus =

Chorus from the opera Il trovatore by Giuseppe Verdi

Coro di Zingari (1853)

The Coro di Zingari (Italian for "Gypsy chorus"), known in English as the "Anvil Chorus", is a chorus from act 2, scene 1, of Giuseppe Verdi's 1853 opera Il trovatore. It depicts Spanish Gypsies striking their anvils at dawn – hence its English name – and singing the praises of hard work, good wine, and Gypsy women. The piece is also commonly known by its opening words, "Vedi! Le fosche".

== Italian libretto and poetic English adaptation ==
Zingari e zingare:
Vedi! le fosche notturne spoglie
De' cieli sveste l'immensa vôlta;
Sembra una vedova che alfin si toglie
i bruni panni ond'era involta.

All'opra! all'opra!
Dàgli! Martella!

Chi del gitano i giorni abbella?
La zingarella!

Uomini:
Versami un tratto; lena e coraggio
Il corpo e l'anima traggon dal bere.

Tutti:
Oh guarda, guarda! del sole un raggio
Brilla più vivido nel mio [tuo] bicchiere!
All'opra, all'opra!

Chi del gitano i giorni abbella?
La zingarella!

Gypsy men and women:
See how the clouds melt away
from the face of the sky when the sun shines, its brightness beaming;
just as a widow, discarding her black robes,
shows all her beauty in brilliance gleaming.

So, to work now!
Lift up your hammers!

Who turns the Gypsy's day from gloom to brightest sunshine?
His lovely Gypsy maid!

Men:
Fill up the goblets! New strength and courage
flow from lusty wine to soul and body.

All:
See how the rays of the sun play and sparkle
and give to our wine gay new splendor.
So, to work now!

Who turns the Gypsy's day from gloom to brightest sunshine?
His lovely Gypsy maid!

== Other uses ==
Thomas Baker wrote Il Trovatore Quadrille (1855) for piano, which includes a movement based on this chorus. Similarly, pianist/composer Charles Grobe wrote variations on the Anvil Chorus for piano in 1857.

The opening day of the 1869 National Peace Jubilee in Boston featured a performance of the Anvil Chorus that featured thousands of musicians, including 50 firemen pounding anvils.

A swing jazz arrangement by Jerry Gray for the Glenn Miller Orchestra released on RCA Bluebird in 1941 reached #3 on the U.S. Billboard charts.

The melodic theme also served as the inspiration for "Rockin' the Anvil" for swing jazz ensemble and accordion on John Serry Sr.'s 1956 album Squeeze Play.

The tune of the chorus was closely parodied in "The Burglar's Chorus" ("With cat-like tread") in Gilbert and Sullivan's 1879 comic opera The Pirates of Penzance, and soon after became a popular song with the lyrics Hail, Hail, the Gang's All Here.
