= Ben Selvin =

American musician, bandleader, and record producer (1898–1980)

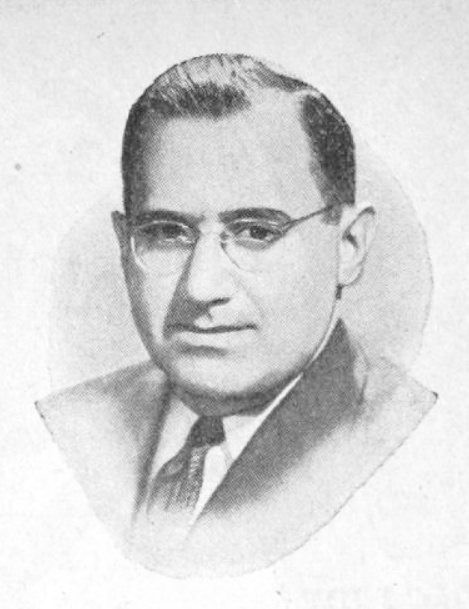
- Ben Selvin, c. 1945

Background information
- Born: Benjamin Bernard Selvin; March 5, 1898; New York City, U.S.
- Died: July 15, 1980 (aged 82) Flower Hill, New York, U.S.
- Genres: Jazz, big band
- Occupations: Musician, bandleader, record producer
- Instrument: Vocals

Benjamin Bernard Selvin (March 5, 1898 – July 15, 1980) was an American musician, bandleader, and record producer. He was known as the Dean of Recorded Music.

According to The Guinness Book of World Records, Selvin recorded more musical sides (on 78-rpm discs) than any other person. One reason for this prolific output is that he recorded for dozens of different record labels during this productive time in the industry, using a different name for each label. His output has been estimated at 13,000 to 20,000 song titles.

== Biography and career ==
Selvin was born in New York City, United States, the son of Jewish Russian immigrants. He started his professional life at age 15 as a fiddle player in New York City night clubs. Six years later, as leader of his own dance band, the Novelty Orchestra, he released what was later alleged to be the biggest-selling popular song in the first quarter-century of recorded music. "Dardanella" allegedly sold more than six million copies and an additional million pieces of sheet music—although in a joint interview with Gustave Haenschen, founding director of popular-music releases at Brunswick Records, Selvin described the alleged record-sales total as "nonsensical" and said the actual sales of "Dardanella" and other purported "million-sellers" in the 1920s was 150,000 discs. He was awarded a gold disc by the Recording Industry Association of America (RIAA) that was presented to Selvin on his retirement on March 14, 1963.

=== Early career (1919–1927) ===
Selvin started recording for Victor in 1919. He proceeded to record for almost all record companies at the time including Paramount, OKeh, Emerson, Lyric, Arto, Cardinal, Vocalion, Pathe, Federal, Brunswick, Grey Gull, Banner (and the related dime store labels), and Columbia. From 1922 to 1925, over half of his records were on Vocalion, but he apparently did not have an exclusive contract with any of these labels until he signed with Columbia in 1927.

=== Columbia ===
From 1927 to 1934 Selvin was artists and repertoire (A&R) director for Columbia Records, where his many productions included musicians Mannie Klein, Benny Goodman, Tommy Dorsey, Jimmy Dorsey, Joe Venuti, Eddie Lang, and Bunny Berigan. Many of these recordings are collectable and prized (especially those recorded in 1931–1934).

There were incorrect reports that Ben Selvin's Band played under the name "Perley Stevens and his Orchestra". Perley Stevens occasionally played with Ben Selvin's Band and many others, including Jimmy and Tommy Dorsey Orchestras and Paul Whiteman's Band. During the Columbia era, Selvin recorded under many different names (for Columbia, OKeh, Odeon, Parlophone, Harmony, Diva, Velvet Tone, and Clarion), including:

- The Broadway Nitelites
- The Knickerbockers
- The Columbians
- The Cavaliers
- The Radiolites
- Barney Trimble and his Oklahomans
- Jerry Mason and his Californians
- The Harmonians
- Rudy Marlow and his Orchestra
- Columbia Photo Players
- Frank Auburn and his Orchestra
- Kolster Dance Orchestra
- Lloyd Keating and his Music
- Earl Marlow and his Orchestra
- Ed Loyd and his Orchestra
- Ray Seeley and his Orchestra
- Sam Nash and his Orchestra
- Mickie Alpert and his Orchestra
- Johnny Walker and his Orchestra
- Chester Leighton and his Sophomores
- Wally Edwards and his Orchestra
- Roy Carroll and his Sands Point Orchestra
- Buddy Campbell and his Orchestra
- Golden Terrace Orchestra
- Bar Harbor Society Orchestra
- Ted Raph and his Orchestra
- Georgia Moonlight Serenaders
- Cloverdale Country Club Orchestra
- Ed Parker and his Orchestra
- Jerry Fenwyck and his Orchestra

=== After Columbia ===
Under his own name, Selvin had accepted an exclusive contract to Brunswick Records when the company's management decided to venture into radio with The Brunswick Hour, under the direction of Gus Haenschen. When it became clear to Brunswick's management that an urgent need existed for pre-recorded music programming for smaller radio stations unable to afford their own orchestras, Brunswick's general manager William A. Brophy agreed, with the recommendations of his assistant secretary Percy L. Deutsch, popular-music director Haenschen, and arranger-conductor Frank Black, to develop a library of high-quality recorded music for leasing to smaller radio stations. The new venture was called the World Broadcasting System, with newly-constructed recording facilities in Manhattan called Sound Studios, Inc. Haenschen persuaded Selvin to leave Brunswick to accept an offer from Columbia Records to become the company's Artists and Repertoire director while also serving as a silent partner in the World Broadcasting venture.

Selvin, who was known for his ability to write orchestral arrangements rapidly and to oversee multiple recording sessions, became a central figure in the success of World Broadcasting. His experience there led him to play a founding role in Muzak in the 1930s. In 1934 he was named Vice President of programming at Muzak in New York City. He was musical director of Majestic Records beginning in 1947. At Columbia Records as A&R director and then vice-president, Selvin was in charge of the recordings of Frank Sinatra, Doris Day, Dinah Shore and Buddy Clark in the late 1940s and early 1950s.

External audio
- You may hear Ben Selvin's collaboration with John Serry on his album Squeeze Play in 1956 Here on listenbrainz.org

In 1953, Selvin left his post as general manager in the Southern Music Publishing Co. and emerged as an A&R director at RCA Victor in charge of the company's popular Camden Records label as well as its RCA Thesaurus electrical transcriptions library. Subsequently, he served as the musical director for a recording in 1954 with John Serry Sr. for RCA Thesaurus. In 1954, Selvin also recruited another artist from the realm of easy listening music for the RCA Thesaurus library, George Melachrino. In 1956, Selvin served once again as musical director with Serry for another swing jazz album at Dot Records (Squeeze Play). As the decade came to a close, Selvin continued to expand the content of the RCA Thesaurus musical library by recruiting several orchestra leaders from the Big Band era, including Sammy Kaye, Freddie Martin and Lawrence Welk. An agreement with the JATP impresario Norman Granz was also signed at this time, which enabled Selvin to showcase performances by leading soloists from the realm of jazz, including Count Basie, Roy Eldridge, Ella Fitzgerald, Stan Getz, Gene Krupa, Oscar Peterson and Art Tatum.

After retirement, Selvin became a consultant to 3M, helping them make the transition from vinyl records to audio cassettes. He also served as a musical consultant to Top of the Fair venue at the New York World's Fair in 1964.

== Death ==
Selvin died at his home at 112 Reni Road in Flower Hill, New York, on July 15, 1980. He was 82 years old at the time of his death, which was caused by a heart attack.

== Honours ==
The Guinness Book of World Records states that Ben Selvin made a record 9,000 recordings as either a bandleader, violinist or recording manager from 1919 to 1966. The cumulative output of recorded songs credited to him over the decades has been estimated to total between 13,000–20,000 different titles. In recognition of his achievements, Selvin was awarded a gold disk by the Recording Industry Association of America (RIAA) in 1963.

== Selected discography ==
Popular recordings from Selvin's extensive discography include:

- "The Original Charleston" (the Columbia 78 rpm version)

The Knickerbockers (Ben Selvin & His Orch.)
NYC – Apr. 10th, 1925
Voc. vocal breaks by Ben Selvin
Columbia 355–D, mx.140514–1

- "Margie"

Selvin's Novelty Orchestra
NYC – Nov., 1920
Voc. Arthur Hall
Grey Gull L–1036–(a), mx.J–3–10

- "So This Is Venice"

Ben Selvin & His Moulin Rouge Orchestra
NYC – Dec., 1923
Voc. Irving Kaufman
Vocalion A–14757, mx.12641

- "Steppin' in Society" (the Columbia 78 rpm version)

The Knickerbockers
NYC – May 26th, 1925
Columbia 391–D, mx.W–140623–2

- "We'll Have a New Home (In the Morning)"

Ben Selvin & His Orchestra
NYC – Dec. 28th, 1927
Vocs. unidentified trio
Columbia 1274–D, mx.W–145445

- "Happy Days Are Here Again"

Annette Hanshaw
(Ben Selvin & His Orchestra – vocs. Annette Hanshaw & The Rollickers)
NYC – Feb. 11th, 1930
Diva Records 3106–G; Harmony 1106–H; Velvet Tone 2106–V

- "Dardanella"

(Felix Bernard – Johnny S. Black)
(Six-million seller)
Selvin's Novelty Orchestra
NYC – Nov. 20th, 1919
Victor 18633–A, mx.23344–3

- "I'm Forever Blowing Bubbles"

(John Kellette – Jaan Kenbrovin)
Selvin's Novelty Orchestra
NYC – Jul. 31st, 1919
Victor 18603–A, mx.B–22966–6

- "Manhattan"

(Richard Rodgers – Lorenz Hart)
The Knickerbockers
NYC – Jul. 15th, 1925
Columbia 422–D, mx.W–140765

- "Sentimental Me"

(Richard Rodgers – Lorenz Hart)
The Knickerbockers
NYC – Jul. 15th, 1925
Columbia 422–D, mx.W–140766

- "I Can't Give You Anything but Love, Baby"

(Jimmy McHugh – Dorothy Fields)
The Knickerbockers
Voc. Vaughn De Leath
NYC – Jun. 1st, 1928
Columbia 1424–D, mx.W–146380

- "You're the Cream in My Coffee"

(Ray Henderson – Buddy DeSylva – Lew Brown)
Eddie Thomas' Collegians (and/or) The Broadway Nitelites (Ben Selvin & His Orch.) –
Voc. Jack Parker
NYC – Oct. 19th, 1928
Columbia 1604–D, mx.W–147140–3

- "I Only Have Eyes for You"

(Harry Warren – Al Dubin)
Ben Selvin & His Orchestra
Voc. Howard Phillips
NYC – Jun. 28th, 1934
Columbia 2936–D, mx.152766

== Archived recordings ==
- The Discography of American Historical Recordings at the University of California – Santa Barbara includes an extensive collection of Ben Selvin's audio recordings on the Brunswick, Columbia, Victor and Vocalion labels which are accessible for online listening.

== Bibliography ==
- Johnson, Richard J., and Shirley, Bernard H. American Dance Bands on Record and Film 1915–1942. Rustbooks, 2010.
- Rust, Brian. American Dance Discography. Arlington House, 1975.
