= Then I'll Be Happy =

1925 song performed by Peggy Lee

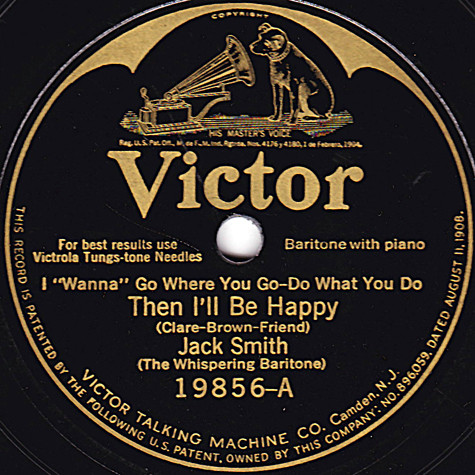

Single by Whispering Jack Smith
- B-side: "Are You Sorry?"
- Published: 1925
- Released: 1926
- Recorded: November 24, 1925
- Genre: Jazz standard
- Label: Victor
- Composer: Cliff Friend
- Lyricists: Lew Brown; Sidney Clare

"Then I'll Be Happy" is a jazz standard composed by Cliff Friend, with lyrics by Lew Brown and Sidney Clare. It was first published in 1925. A popular recording in 1926 was by Whispering Jack Smith.

== Other recordings ==
- Peggy Lee - recorded December 26, 1947 as "I Wanna Go Where You Go (Then I'll Be Happy)".
- Bing Crosby recorded the song in 1956 for use on his radio show and it was subsequently included in the box set The Bing Crosby CBS Radio Recordings (1954-56) issued by Mosaic Records (catalog MD7-245) in 2009.
- Eddie Fisher - a single release in 1955.
- Dinah Shore - a single release in 1955.
- Jaye P. Morgan - for her album Just You, Just Me (1958).
- Robert Goulet - included in his album The Wonderful World of Love (1962).

== See also ==
- List of 1920s jazz standards
