= Pietro Deiro Presents the Accordion Orchestra =

1960 album of accordion music

Studio album by Joeseph Biviano Carmen Carrozza Angelo Di Pippo John Serry et al
- Released: 1960, New York City
- Recorded: 1960, New York City
- Genre: Classical, pop, instrumental
- Length: 38:30
- Label: Coral Records, CRL 57323
- Producer: Pietro Deiro Jr.

Pietro Deiro Presents the Accordion Orchestra is a high fidelity stereo phonographic album which was released on the Coral Records label in 1960 and featured early performances of symphonic classical music by an ensemble consisting entirely of virtuoso orchestral accordionists. It was one of the first accordion orchestra records on a major label.

== Background ==
Between 1938 and 1960, the accordion gained prestige through events like the Carnegie Hall concert by Charles Magnante's quartet. The Sano Accordion Symphony performed a landmark concert on May 15, 1960 at Town Hall in New York. The concert featured a commission from William Grant Still and arrangements of light classical fare. It was in this climate that Deiro Jr. and Biviano recorded their album.

Joeseph Biviano was considered the "father of the accordion symphony movement". Pietro Deiro Jr. was a publisher of accordion music and the son of Pietro Deiro who was billed as "The Caruso of the Accordion".

The album was a result of their partnership and demonstrates the accordion as a concert instrument. Several of the players were honored by ASCAP around the time of the recording. They were pictured with composers Paul Creston and Virgil Thomson. Creston had been an important commission target by the American Accordionists' Association, as it sought to elevate the instrument.

The album features sixteen accordions emulating an orchestra. The musicians were all elite players during the Golden Age of Radio. The lineup included Angelo Di Pippo, Eugene Ettore and John Serry.

The album features light music arranged for accordions. Selections included works by Nikolai Rimsky-Korsakov, Niccolo Paganini, Pyotr Ilyich Tchaikovsky, Carl Maria von Weber. The album also included Biviano's arrangements of popular music "Three Blind Mice", "La cumparsita", and "Beguine di Roma".

The instruments were manufactured in Italy to reproduce the various timbres and musical textures of a classical orchestra. The liner notes boast, "The melodic potentialities of the accordion have been common knowledge for some time. Pietro Deiro and Joe Biviano, however, imagined the already remarkable range of the accordion could be extended another step further.

== Track listing ==
Side 1

1. "Danse Des Bouffons" (Nikolai Rimsky-Korsakov) – 3:30
2. "Beguine Di Roma" - (Joseph Biviano) – 2:20
3. "Invitation To The Dance" - (Carl Maria von Weber – 4:59
4. "La Cumparsita" - (Gerardo Matos Rodríguez) – 4:08
5. "Caprices: La Chasse" - (Niccolo Paganini) – 4:00
6. "Danse Chinoise" - (Pyotr Ilyich Tchaikovsky) – 1:12

Side 2

1. "Three Blind Mice" – 3:30
2. "Danse Des Mirlitons" - (Pyotr Ilyich Tchaikovsky) – 2:16
3. "Valse Des Fleurs" - (Pyotr Ilyich Tchaikovsky) – 4:36
4. "Flight of the Bumblebee" - (Nikolai Rimsky-Korsakov) – 1:18
5. "The Rooster" - (Joseph Biviano) – 3:52
6. "Careless One Cha-Cha-Cha" - (unknown) – 2:42

== Personnel ==
Accordions

- Joseph Biviano
- Carmen Carrozza
- Val Dennis
- Angelo Di Pippo
- Eugene Ettore
- Tony Ettore
- Joseph Fezza
- Peter Giradi
- Orlando Di Girolamo
- Tony Mecca
- Catherine Manzi
- Joseph Manzi
- John Serry
- Robert Skilling
- Alfonso Veltri

Other players

- Ruby Jamis - Bass
- John Blowers - Drummer

== Reviews ==
Billboard gave the album three stars and felt it had "good sales potential" High Fidelity praised the album's "catholic program" and felt the album "displays the limitations as well as the potentialities of his assemblage...Admirers of the accordion, nonetheless, should be enchanted by this near tour de force."

Catholic Digest admired the ensemble's "entirely different sound" and enthused, "They are capable of reproducing every instrument of the orchestra." Subsequent to its release, the recording also received attention in the Swedish accordion publication Accordion Journalen along with several newspaper publications in the United States including Weirton Daily Times and the San Antonio Light.

== Archived recordings ==
The Discography of American Historical Recordings at University of California, Santa Barbara contains a master copy of the album. Additional copies of the album are preserved at the University of Missouri Kansas City - University Libraries.
