= Dardanella =

1919 song by Fred Fisher, Felix Bernard and Johnny S. Black

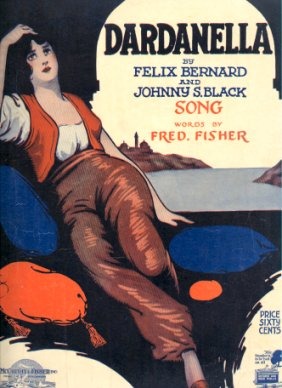
- Sheet music cover, 1919

Song by Selvin's Novelty Orchestra
- B-side: My Isle of Golden Dreams
- Published: May 21, 1919 by McCarthy & Fisher, Inc., New York.
- Released: December 1919
- Recorded: November 20, 1919, take 3
- Studio: Victor Studios, New York City
- Genre: Jazz Dance Band
- Label: Victor 18633
- Composers: Felix Bernard, Johnny S. Black
- Lyricist: Fred Fisher

"Dardanella" is a popular song published in 1919 by McCarthy & Fisher, Inc., a firm owned by lyricist Fred Fisher, lyricist, for music composed by Felix Bernard and Johnny S. Black. It was originally titled "Turkish Tom Toms", a title which no publisher would touch. Fisher renamed it and wrote the lyrics.

Bandleader Ben Selvin (1898–1980) recorded "Dardanella" for several record labels (including Victor and Paramount). His main recording was made for Victor on November 20, 1919, under the name of Selvin's Novelty Orchestra. It was released December 1919. It was the second-highest selling single of the 1920s. Selvin's recording broke records by becoming the first record to sell more than three million copies, and would go on to sell more than 5 million.

As with most hit records of the time, the market was soon rife with unauthorized copies of the tune. A front page ad in Variety (January 2, 1920) warned "thieves and pirates" not to "imitate, copy or steal any part of 'Dardanella'." There were, however, a number of other successful recordings in 1920, by Prince's Orchestra, Harry Raderman's Jazz Orchestra, and Henry Burr and Albert Campbell.

Notable subsequent recordings were by Acker Bilk and His Paramount Jazz Band (included in his album A Stranger No More); by Bing Crosby and Louis Armstrong on their 1960 album Bing & Satchmo, and by Geoff Muldaur and Maria Muldaur on their 1974 Warner/Reprise album Sweet Potatoes featuring Amos Garrett.

== Bibliography ==
- Fisher, Fred (w.); Felix Bernard/Johnny S. Black (m). "Dardanella" (Sheet Music). New York: McCarthy & Fisher (1919).
- Whitburn, Joel (1986). Joel Whitburn's Pop Memories 1890-1954. Wisconsin, USA: Record Research Inc. ISBN 0-89820-083-0.
