= That's a Plenty =

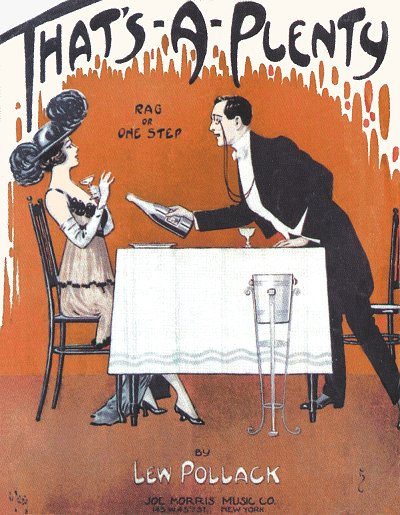
- Sheet music cover, 1914

Song
- Published: 1914
- Genre: Ragtime
- Songwriters: Composer: Lew Pollack; Lyricist: Ray Gilbert

External audio
- You may hear That's a Plenty performed by the Joe Biviano Accordion and Rhythm Sextette with John Serry and Tony Mottola in 1946; Here on Archive.org

"That's a Plenty" is a 1914 ragtime piano composition by Lew Pollack. Lyrics by Ray Gilbert (born 1912) were added decades later. Several popular vocal versions have been recorded, but it is more often performed as an instrumental.

The composition started as a rag but is nowadays played as a part of the Dixieland jazz repertoire. The song has been recorded by numerous artists and is considered a jazz standard. The first recording was on July 7, 1914, by Prince's Band (Columbia A-5582), and the New Orleans Rhythm Kings recorded their rendition in 1923. In 1946 it was recorded by the jazz accordionist John Serry Sr. and guitarist Tony Mottola as members of the Biviano Accordion & Rhythm Sextette for Sonora records. The comedian Jackie Gleason used it in his television shows in the 1950s and 1960s.

Among the hundreds of later recordings of this standard, the following are particularly notable. Freddy Martin and His Orchestra recorded a version in 1950. Sheet music for this version featuring Freddy Martin on the cover has the lyrics printed inside. It was recorded by Albert Nicholas (clarinet), with the Big Chief Jazz Band, in Oslo on August 29, 1955, and released on a 78-rpm record (Philips P 53038).

Bing Crosby and Connee Boswell recorded a vocal version in September 1952 for use in Crosby's radio show broadcast on November 27, 1952. Decca Records mastered this for commercial release on November 17, 1952.

The Pollack and Gilbert song is not to be confused with a 1909 song of the same name by Henry Creamer and Bert Williams.

== See also ==
- List of pre-1920 jazz standards
