= Nobody's Sweetheart Now =

"Nobody's Sweetheart"

Song
- Published: February 4, 1924 ©Jack Mills, Inc., New York.
- Songwriters: Gus Kahn and Ernie Erdman
- Composers: Billy Meyers and Elmer Schoebel

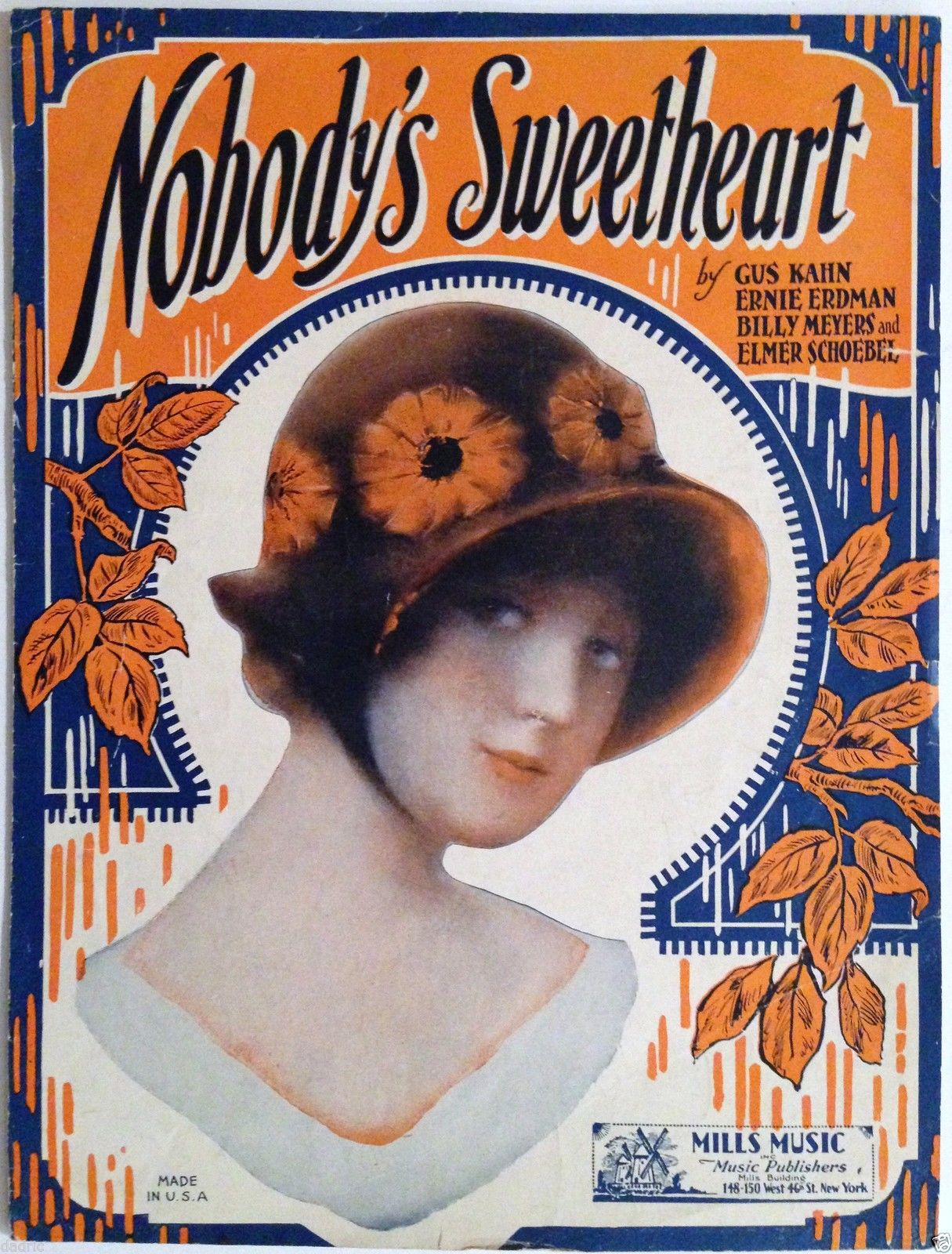
1924 sheet music cover, Mills Music, New York.

"Nobody's Sweetheart", also known as "Nobody's Sweetheart Now" and "You're Nobody's Sweetheart Now", is a popular song, written in 1924, with music by Billy Meyers and Elmer Schoebel, and lyrics by Gus Kahn and Ernie Erdman. The song is a jazz and pop standard.

== Background ==
The song was introduced by Ted Lewis in the Broadway revue The Passing Show of 1923. The song was duly published in 1924 by Mills Music in New York by Jack Mills. It was first recorded on February 22, 1924 by Isham Jones and his Orchestra and released on Brunswick Records as a 78 single.

Joel Whitburn assessed the early popular recordings of the song as being by Isham Jones (1924); Red Nichols (1928); Paul Whiteman (1930); Cab Calloway (1931); and by The Mills Brothers (1931).

The song was used as the theme for the Joan Davis Time program on old-time radio.

== Other recordings ==
The song is a jazz and pop standard recorded by the following musicians:

- Aileen Stanley and Billy Murray (1924)
- Louisiana Rhythm Kings (1928)
- Red Nichols & His Five Pennies (1928)
- Fred Elizalde & His Music (1929)
- Paul Whiteman & His Orchestra – recorded October 9, 1929.
- Louis Armstrong - a single release (1930).
- Cab Calloway & His Orchestra (1931)
- Eubie Blake & His Orchestra (1931)
- The Mills Brothers (1931)
- Red Pepper Sam (1931)
- Tampa Red (1931)
- Billy Cotton and His Band (1932)
- Roy Fox and His Band (vocal: Al Bowlly) – recorded December 7, 1931. (See Al Bowlly discography)
- Clyde McCoy and His Drake Hotel Orchestra (1933)
- Nat Gonella and His Trumpet (1933)
- Benny Goodman Trio (1936)
- Oscar Alemán (1938)
- Connee Boswell – recorded August 22, 1940 for Decca Records (catalog 3425A).
- Kay Starr – a single release for Capitol Records (catalog 1194) (1950).
- Doris Day – included in the album I'll See You in My Dreams (1951).
- Bing Crosby – issued as a single release. Originally recorded for a radio show in 1952 and mastered for commercial release on February 14, 1952.
- Chet Atkins – for his album Chet Atkins' Gallopin' Guitar (1953).
- Johnnie Ray – a single release on the Columbia Records label (1954).
- John Serry Sr. and his accordion ensemble for RCA Thesaurus (1954)
- Della Reese – included in her album Della Reese at Basin Street East (1964)
- Leon Redbone – for his album Double Time (1977).
- Captain Sensible – for the album Women and Captains First (1982).
- Acker Bilk – included in the album Acker Bilk in Holland (1983).
- Meya Collings – with Capital Focus Jazz Band played piano and sang “Nobody’s Sweetheart Now” with the accompaniment of the whole band dedicated to Red Pepper Sam (2017).

== Film appearances ==
- 1929 The Vagabond Lover – performed by Rudy Vallée and the Connecticut Yankees
- 1932 Red-Headed Woman
- 1932 Betty Boop M.D – sung by Red Pepper Sam
- 1940 I'm Nobody's Sweetheart Now – sung by Constance Moore
- 1943 Stormy Weather – danced by an unidentified male dancer immediately after the "I Lost My Sugar in Salt Lake City" number and played when Gabe brings candy to the chorus girls
- 1943 Hit Parade of 1943
- 1944 Atlantic City – sung by Belle Baker
- 1944 Two Thousand Women
- 1945 It's a Pleasure – first solo skating number.
- 1945 Waterloo Road
- 1951 I'll See You in My Dreams – sung by Doris Day.
- 1966 Who's Afraid of Virginia Woolf? – sung as the parody line "I'm nobody's houseboy now . . ."
- 1984 Cotton Club

== External reference ==
- Song lyric with chords
