= Think Well of Me =

Studio album by Jack Teagarden
- Released: 1962
- Recorded: January 17–19, 1962
- Studios: Van Gelder Studio, Englewood Cliffs, NJ
- Genre: Jazz
- Length: 35:58
- Labels: Verve; V/V6 8465
- Producer: Creed Taylor

Jack Teagarden chronology
The Dixie Sound of Jack Teagarden (1962)	Think Well of Me (1962)	Jack Teagarden (1962)

Think Well of Me is a 1962 studio album by trombonist/vocalist Jack Teagarden, performing songs by Willard Robison, accompanied by an orchestra arranged and conducted by Bob Brookmeyer or Russ Case, that was released by the Verve label.

== Reception ==
Professional ratings
Review scores
Source	Rating
Allmusic	4.5/5 stars

Allmusic awarded the album 4½ stars with Scott Yanow stating "For what would be his next-to-last album in January, 1962, he recorded ten Robison songs (plus the slightly out of place non-Robison standard "Where Are You") while backed by a string orchestra that included both a harp and his trumpeter Don Goldie. Bob Brookmeyer and Russ Case contributed all but one arrangement, and although the strings were certainly not necessary (since they do not add much to the music), the prestigious setting must have pleased the trombonist ... His short solos are often quite exquisite, and this often touching, somewhat rare date is one of the strongest of his final period.".

In JazzTimes, Doug Ramsey wrote "This is a Teagarden album like nothing else in his 40-year discography. Made in 1962, precisely two years before his death, it reflects much that was important about the man and musician; the uncanny precision and languorous passion of his trombone playing, the intimacy of his singing, his blues core, the quality that never declined even in the weariness of his final years".

== Track listing ==
All compositions by Willard Robison except where noted

1. "Where Are You?" (Jimmy McHugh, Harold Adamson) – 2:50
2. "Cottage for Sale" – 3:34
3. "Guess I'll Go Back Home This Summer" – 3:39
4. "I'm a Fool About My Mama" – 3:30
5. "Don't Smoke in Bed" – 3:18
6. "In a Little Waterfront Cafe" – 3:55
7. "Think Well of Me" – 2:40
8. "Old Folks" – 2:45
9. "Country Boy Blues" – 4:06
10. "Tain't So Honey, Tain't So" – 2:40
11. "Round the Old Deserted Farm" – 2:55

== Personnel ==
- Jack Teagarden – trombone, vocals
- Don Goldie – trumpet
- Unidentified orchestra arranged and conducted by Bob Brookmeyer (tracks 1, 2, 5, 6 & 10) or Russ Case (tracks 3, 4, 7–9 & 11) probably including:
- Bernie Leighton – piano, celeste
- Barry Galbraith – guitar
- Art Davis – bass
