= Mort Lindsey =

American film composer (1923–2012)

Mort Lindsey (born Morton Lippman; March 21, 1923 – May 4, 2012) was an orchestrator, composer, pianist, conductor and musical director for Judy Garland, Barbra Streisand, Pat Boone, Jack Narz, and Merv Griffin.

== Early life ==
Mort Lippman was born in Newark, New Jersey on March 21, 1923. He attended Newark Arts High School. He served stateside as a lieutenant in the Army Air Forces during World War II, and received a bachelor's degree from Columbia College and a master's from Columbia University in the 1940s. He later returned to Columbia University, earning a doctoral degree in music education in 1974.

== Career ==
In the late 1940s and early 1950s, Lindsey was part of a trio called the Playboys with jazz guitarist Johnny Smith and organist Arlo Hults at NBC. In 1956, he was credited with composing the song "Rock 'N' Roll Polka" as recorded by John Serry Sr. (See Squeeze Play).

Lindsey was the musical director and conductor for Judy Garland's 1961 tour, including her concert on April 23, 1961, at Carnegie Hall.

Lindsey was also a composer of motion picture scores including Gay Purr-ee (1962), 40 Pounds of Trouble (1962), I Could Go On Singing (1963), Stolen Hours (1963), The Best Man (1964), Real Life (1979) and Cats Don't Dance (1997) for which he composed the song "Tell Me Lies".

Lindsey served as musical director and bandleader of The Merv Griffin Show from 1965 to 1986 and composed one of the show's themes. In addition, he and Griffin composed the song "Changing Keys", which served as the theme to Griffin's game show Wheel of Fortune in several versions from 1983 until 2000.

In 1969, Lindsey won an Emmy Award for Outstanding Individual Achievement in Music as musical director for Barbra Streisand: A Happening in Central Park a concert attended by 135,000 people that aired as a music special on CBS in 1968.

== Family ==
In 1944, Lindsey married Betty Szold. They later divorced. In 1954, he married Betty (Bonney) Broyles who went by the stage name Judy Johnson while touring with the Les Brown Orchestra. He had three sons, David Lippman, Steve Lindsey, and Trevor Lindsey; and three daughters, Deborah Morris, Judy Grant, and Bonney Dunn.

Lindsey died at his home in Malibu, California on May 4, 2012.
