= Sterling Conaway =

American jazz musician

Sterling Bruce Conaway (October 26, 1900, Washington, D.C. – November 1973) was an American jazz banjoist and mandolinist.

== Career ==
Conaway played early in his career with Duke Ellington in his hometown of Washington, D.C., then relocated to Chicago, where he joined the band of Carroll Dickerson. He played in Cyril Fullerton's band in 1924 and recorded with Helen Gross on ukulele. Later in the 1920s he moved to Europe, where he worked with Eddie South, Noble Sissle, Freddy Johnson, Freddy Taylor, and Leon Abbey, as well as with his own groups. He was in Bombay in 1936, playing with Crickett Smith, but returned to the United States in 1939.

== Family ==
Sterling's brother, Lincoln M. Conaway (né Lincoln Malvan Conoway; 1896 – 1968), also played banjo and guitar. He notably played in jazz recording sessions in New York between 1924 and 1927, including one on September 27, 1927, with Bessie Smith for Columbia performing "Mean Old Bed Bug Blues" by Leo Wood and "A Good Man Is Hard to Find," by Eddie Green.
