= Anthony Galla-Rini =

American accordionist and composer

- Born: January 18, 1904
- Died: July 30, 2006 (aged 102)
- Genres: vaudeville; classical; rumba
- Instrument: accordion

Anthony Galla-Rini (January 18, 1904 – July 30, 2006) was an American accordionist, arranger, composer, conductor, author, and teacher, and is considered by many to be the first American accordionist to promote the accordion as a legitimate concert instrument.

== Early life ==
Galla-Rini was born in Manchester, Connecticut, the third of seven children to John and Angela Galla-Rini, an Italian immigrant family. His father started teaching Galla-Rini the cornet at the age of four. In the same year, he made his debut on the Vaudeville circuit with the family band, and an encore performance of "Casey Jones" on the cornet. It was at this time that Galla-Rini also learned to play the accordion, a three-row button instrument.

Galla-Rini performed on the Vaudeville circuit for twenty years, in that time learning to play 11 woodwind and brass instruments in addition to the accordion, as well as theory in harmony and counterpoint, and operatic and symphonic conducting. He toured the United States with his family, playing with such Vaudeville stars as Mae West, The Marx Brothers, Jack Benny, Jimmy Durante, and Eddie Cantor.

After his sisters dropped out of the family's act when he was twelve, Galla-Rini's accordion playing became more important to the act as his father John played a more diverse range of instruments. It was at this time Galla-Rini realized the accordion was a complete musical instrument in itself, devoting more time and attention to the accordion and eventually abandoning all other musical instruments in favor of the accordion.

== Career ==
In 1924 Galla-Rini dropped out of his father's Vaudeville act due to disputes over salary, and joined his sisters, forming a separate act that lasted until 1932. Their salary peaked at around $600 per week.

The Vaudeville ended with the advent of motion pictures with sound, forcing Galla-Rini's family to find other forms of work. Galla-Rini decided to open an accordion studio in San Francisco. He established himself as a teacher, writing both accordion instruction books and also various music for the instrument.

In 1933, Galla-Rini married Dina Petromilli, and their son Ronald Pascal was born three years later. Eventually Galla-Rini moved from California to New York City, to be closer to various music publishers, Galla-Rini eventually writing music for more than 30 publishing houses.

Galla-Rini was one of the founding members of the American Accordionists' Association (AAA) in 1938 in New York City, and is in fact their first member. He also founded the International Accordion Teachers' Guild (ATG), in 1941 in Chicago serving as President Emeritus of that society throughout his career. In addition, Galla-Rini also served as a Vice-President of the Confédération Internationale des Accordéonistes (CIA), a member of the United Nations' International Music Council (IMC).

In 1941 Galla-Rini also composed his Accordion Concerto in G Minor (no. 1), and premiered it with the Oklahoma City University Symphony Orchestra on November 15, 1941. Since then there have been more than 39 performances of this concerto in the United States as well as additional performances in England, Finland, Norway and Canada.

This concerto was recorded by Swedish accordionist and Galla-Rini protégé Jörgen Sundeqvist with organist Håkan Dahlen and released in 2005 on a CD by Courthourse Music of Sweden.

Galla-Rini returned to California in 1942, and began teaching accordion again. He joined a rumba band playing at the Trocadero on Sunset Boulevard, leading to invitations to record soundtracks for the Hollywood film industry, playing in many films, including Rhapsody in Blue, High Noon, and The Gunfighter.

During the next decade, he performed on concert tours in various theaters across the United States. He also toured England, Scotland, Norway and Sweden in 1950, taking his family with him.

In 1951 he represented the ATG at the CIA General Assembly and Coupe Mondiale in Paris, resulting in the CIA accepting the ATG as a member organization. In 1958 and 1959, he performed as a guest artist in Carnegie Hall.

In 1968, Dina Galla-Rini died. Three years later, Anthony married Dolly Cortella. He was married to her until she died at the age of 101.

In 1975, the President of Italy conferred on him the title of "Cavalier of the Star of Solidarity" in recognition of his efforts towards strengthening the cultural bonds between Italian and American people and for his interest in the development of the Italian accordion in America. Galla-Rini was also the first person to be inducted in the ATG Hall of Fame on his 99th birthday in 2003.

In 1976 he composed "Accordion Concerto No. 2 in E minor" (in three movements) for the free-bass system. And in 1983 he composed "Sonata in D minor" for accordion (also in three movements).

== Death and legacy ==
Galla-Rini died of a heart attack in a hospital in Corona, CA at the age of 102 after a nurse reported problems at the nursing home where he lived. Galla-Rini's career spanned 98 years as a professional accordionist, and more than 74 years as an accordion teacher. He has arranged hundreds of transcriptions for accordion ensembles, orchestras and soloists. He has also played a major part in pioneering the development of the modern accordion, developing the treble and bass registers, as well as standardizing the stradella bass system on the accordion.

== Bibliography ==
A Collection of Lectures for Accordionists (Music Graphics Press, San Diego: 1981)
