= Jean Gabriel Marie (1907–1970) =

French composer (1907–1970)

Jean Gabriel Marie (1907–1970) was a French composer, son of the composer Jean Gabriel Prosper Marie.

== Works and career ==
His works included the opera Mirèio, which was awarded the Prix de l'Académie des Arts, Lettres, et Sciences shortly after its premier in 1939. The composition was based on the Provençal poem that inspired Gounod's opera Mireille. He wrote Suite provençale in six movements, which is occasionally performed, based on themes from the opera. Chamber music and organ works are significant among his other compositions.

He was director of the Institut Gabriel-Marie in Marseille for many years until his death at age 63.
