= Art Van Damme =

American jazz accordionist

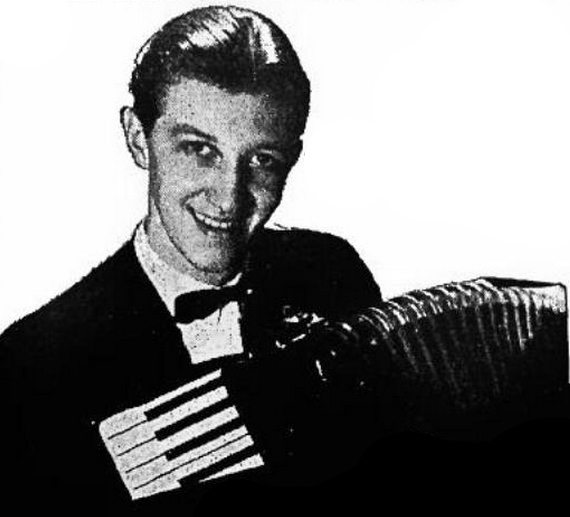

Background information
- Born: April 9, 1920; Norway, Michigan, USA
- Died: February 15, 2010 (aged 89) Roseville, California, USA
- Genres: Jazz
- Occupation: Musician
- Instrument: Accordion

Art Van Damme (April 9, 1920 – February 15, 2010) was an American jazz accordionist.

Van Damme took up the accordion from age nine after listening to old records of Pietro Deiro. His first teacher of the instrument was Pines Caviani. He studied classical accordion with Caviani and, after his family moved to Chicago, continued studies with accordion teacher Andy Rizzo.

Inspired to play jazz, he first patterned himself on Benny Goodman, as Van Damme found the figures Goodman played could be translated on the accordion. He started his own group in 1938 as a high school student. Later in 1944 he formed a group that joined NBC as staff musicians.

He was consecutively named best accordionist by the Down Beat magazine readers poll during the 1950s and 1960s, taking top spot from 1951 to 1961.

Though named top accordionist by polls in the 1950s, Van Damme noted his style featured more arrangement work and was influenced by his position as a TV musician. He played a piano accordion while others such as Mat Mathews and Leon Sash, whom he spoke highly of, played chromatic accordions more suited for improvisational jazz.

Van Damme toured Europe and was popular with jazz enthusiasts in Japan.

Van Damme was married, and had three children. After he retired to Roseville, California, he continued to perform almost to the end of his life. He had been ill with pneumonia for several weeks when he died on February 15, 2010, aged 89.

== Discography ==
=== As leader ===
- 1949: Cocktail Capers (Capitol, CC-105 [78rpm 3-disc album set]/H-178 [10" LP]/T-178 [12" LP])/54-504,54-505,54-506 (7-inch 45 rpm box set)
- 1952: More Cocktail Capers (Capitol, H-300 [10" LP]/T-300 [12" LP])
- 1953: Martini Time (Columbia, CL-6265 [10" LP]/CL-630 [12" LP])
- 1954: The Van Damme Sound (Columbia, CL-544 [12" LP])
- 1956: House Party (Columbia, CL-2585 [10" LP])
- 1956: Manhattan Time (Columbia, CL-801)
- 1956: The Art Of Van Damme (Columbia, CL-876) (Philips, B-07189-L)
- 1957: Once Over Lightly (w/Jo Stafford) (Columbia, CL-968) (Philips, B-07241-L)
- 1958: They're Playing Our Song: Fifty Years Of Hit Songs (Columbia, C2L-7) 2LP
- 1959: Everything's Coming Up Music (Columbia, CL-1382/CS-8177)
- 1961: Accordion à la Mode (Columbia, CL-1563/CS-8363)
- 1962: Art Van Damme Swings Sweetly (Columbia, CL-1794/CS 8594)
- 1963: A Perfect Match (w/Johnny Smith) (Columbia, CL-2013/CS-8813)
- 1964: Septet: The New Sound Of Art Van Damme (Columbia, CL-2192/CS-8992)
- 1965: Lover Man! (Pickwick, SPC-3009) compilation
- 1966: With Art Van Damme In San Francisco (MPS, MPS 15073) (SABA, SB 15073 ST)
- 1967: Music For Lovers (Harmony, HL-7439/HS-11239) compilation
- 1967: The Gentle Art Of Art (MPS, MPS 15114) (SABA, SB 15114 ST)
- 1967: Ecstasy (MPS, MPS 15115) (SABA, SB 15115 ST)
- 1968: Lullaby In Rhythm (MPS, MPS 15171)
- 1968: Art In The Black Forest (MPS, MPS 15172)
- 1969: On The Road (MPS, MPS 15235)
- 1969: Art And Four Brothers (MPS, MPS 15236)
- 1970: Blue World (MPS, MPS 15277) (Pausa, PR-7027)
- 1970: Keep Going (MPS, MPS 15278) (Pausa, PR-7104)
- 1972: The Many Moods Of Art (MPS/BASF, MC 25113) 2LP
- 1973: Star Spangled Rhythm (MPS/BASF, MC 25157) 2LP
- 1973: Squeezing Art & Tender Flutes (MPS, MPS 15372) (Pausa, PR-7126)
- 1973: Art Van Damme with Strings (MPS, MPS 15412) - note: quintet (including Eberhard Weber and Sigi Schwab) recorded in 1973; strings added in 1979 (MPS, MPS 0068.239)
- 1974: Invitation (w/The Singers Unlimited) (MPS, MPS 15411) (Pausa, PR-7066)
- 1978: By Request (Sonic Arts, LS-12)
- 1979: Art In Sweden (Great Music Production, GLP-7915)
- 1980: Live In Finland (Finlandia, NEA-LP-44)
- 1981: Art & Liza (w/Liza Matson) (Svenska Media AB, SMTE-5003)
- 1982: Art Van Damme * In Norway (CBS, 85586)
- 1983: Pa Kungliga Djurgarden (Pi, PLP-005)
- 1983: Art Van Damme And Friends (Pausa, PR-7151)
- 1986: Art (Intersound, ISST-201)
- 1995: Two Originals: Keep Going/Blue World (MPS, MPS 529093 CD) - reissues
- 1998: The Van Damme Sound/Martini Time (Collectables, 5870 CD) - reissues
- 1999: Once Over Lightly/Manhattan Time (Collectors Choice Music, CCM-482 CD) - reissues
- 2000: Accordion à la Mode/A Perfect Match (Collectables, 6633 CD) - reissues
- 2000: State Of Art (MPS, MPS 841413 CD)
- 2006: Swinging The Accordion On MPS (MPS, MPS 06024 98165812 CD) 5-CD box set
- 2010: So Nice! (MPS, MPS 06025 27528595 CD) - note: reissue of Art Van Damme with Strings
- 2016: A Perfect Match/Martini Time (Cheesecake, CD) - reissues

=== As sideman ===
- Frances Bergen, 1956: The Beguiling Miss Frances Bergen (w/Art Van Damme Quintet) (Columbia, CL-873)
