= Virgil Childers =

American blues musician (1901–1939)

- Born: Vergil Childers c. 1901; Blacksburg, South Carolina, United States
- Died: December 10, 1939 (aged 38) Shelby, North Carolina, United States
- Genres: Piedmont blues; ragtime; country blues
- Instruments: Guitar; vocals

Virgil Childers (c. 1901 – December 10, 1939) was an American blues musician, who hailed from South Carolina, United States.

== Biography ==
Childers was born in Blacksburg, South Carolina to parents Pick Childers and Sarah Smith, and resided there for the duration of his life. Childers recorded six songs for Bluebird Records in Charlotte, North Carolina, in 1938. The recordings are a variety of blues songs, pop music of the time, and Tin Pan Alley tunes. Childers played in a ragtime style that is reminiscent of a swing band.

On December 10, 1939, Childers was shot and killed while trying to escape from a police officer in Shelby, North Carolina. Childers was buried in Shelby on December 13, 1939.

== Recordings ==
All recordings were made on January 25, 1938, in Charlotte, North Carolina.

- "Preacher & the Bear"
- "Red River Blues"
- "Somebody Stole My Jane"
- "Travelin' Man"
- "Dago Blues"
- "Who's That Knockin' On My Door"
