= Bernie Leighton =

American jazz musician

- Born: 30 January 1921; West Haven, Connecticut, U.S.
- Died: 16 September 1994; Coconut Creek, Florida, U.S.
- Occupation: Jazz pianist

Bernie Leighton (January 30, 1921 – September 16, 1994) was an American jazz pianist.

Leighton was born in West Haven, Connecticut. He first played professionally at the end of the 1930s. He played with Bud Freeman, Leo Reisman, Raymond Scott (1940) and Benny Goodman (1940–41) before serving in the Army. Following his discharge, he worked as a studio sideman, with Dave Tough (1946), Billie Holiday (1949), Neal Hefti (1951), Goodman again, Artie Shaw (1953), John Serry, Sr. (1956), James Moody (1963) and Bob Wilber (1969). He did a tour with Tony Bennett in 1972–73.

While Leighton was best known as a sideman, he also recorded extensively as a leader; he recorded for Keynote Records in 1946, Mercury Records in 1950, an LP on Columbia Records in 1950, Brunswick in 1951, LPs for Disneyland and Capitol in 1957, and a tribute to Duke Ellington released in 1974.

His instrumental cover of Connie Francis' "Don't Break the Heart That Loves You" on the Colpix label in 1962 reached #101 on Billboard's listing.

Leighton has a cameo role in the film Hannah and Her Sisters (1986). He died in Coconut Creek, Florida.

== Discography ==
External audio
- You may hear Bernie Leighton performing with John Serry on the album Squeeze Play in 1956 Here on archive.org

Bernie Leighton Quintet and Quartet and With Joe Thomas (trumpeter) (Keynote 1946)

With George Barnes (musician)

- Guitars Galore (Mercury, 1961)

With James Moody

- Great Day (Argo, 1963)

With Gerry Mulligan

- Holliday with Mulligan (DRG, 1961 [1980]) with Judy Holliday

With Mark Murphy

- That's How I Love the Blues! (Riverside, 1962)

With Charlie Parker

- Big Band (Clef, 1954)

With John Serry Sr.

- Squeeze Play (album) (Dot Records, 1956) with Al Caiola

With Jack Teagarden

- Think Well of Me (Verve, 1962)

With Cal Tjader

- Warm Wave (Verve, 1964)

With Jackie Gleason Orchestra on multiple Capitol recordings from 1956 through 1966
