= Somebody Stole My Gal =

Single by Ted Weems and His Orchestra
- A-side: "Covered Wagon Days"
- Published: 1918
- Released: January 11, 1924
- Recorded: November 20, 1923
- Genre: Traditional pop
- Length: 3:02
- Label: Victor
- Songwriter: Leo Wood

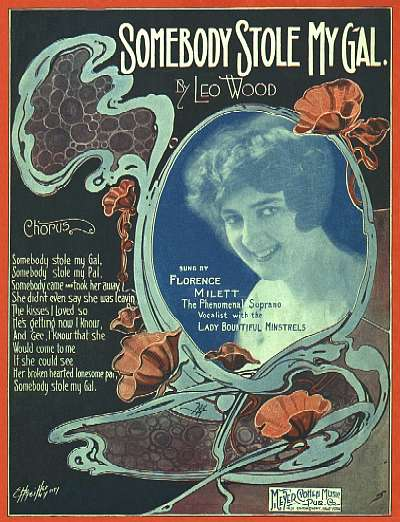
Sheet music cover, 1918

"Somebody Stole My Gal" is a popular song from 1918, written by Leo Wood. In 1924, Ted Weems & his Orchestra had a five-week run at number one with his million-selling version. Its Pee Wee Hunt and his orchestra version is also known in Japan, particularly in Osaka and surrounding area as the theme song used by Yoshimoto Kogyo for their theatre comedies at Namba Grand Kagetsu and other venues.

The song has been featured in several Hollywood films, including:

- The Tip-Off (1931)
- Somebody Stole My Gal (1931)
- Little Jack Little & Orchestra (1936)
- When Willie Comes Marching Home (1950)
- My Favorite Year (1982)
- The Grass Harp (1995)
- Melinda and Melinda (2004)
- The Aviator (2004)

== Other recordings ==
- Florence Millett – 1918
- Ted Weems & His Orch. (Instr.) – 1924
- Fletcher Henderson & His Orch. – 1924
- Bix Beiderbecke – 1928
- Fred Elizalde & His Anglo American Band – 1928
- Bennie Moten's Kansas City Orch. – 1930
- Ted Lewis & His Band (vocal: Ted Lewis) – 1931
- Cab Calloway & His Orch. – 1931
- Billy Cotton & His Band – 1931 (Cotton used the song as his signature tune).
- Fats Waller & His Rhythm – 1935
- Virgil Childers – 1938 in Charlotte, North Carolina
- Count Basie & His Orch. – 1940
- Benny Goodman & His Orch. (Columbia-35916) – 1940
- Johnnie Ray – 1952 (a number 6 hit in the UK Singles Chart in 1953)
- John Serry Sr. and his ensemble for "RCA Thesaurus" – 1954
- Pee Wee Hunt and his orchestra – 1954 (Album "Swingin' Around")
- Hot Club Melomani – 1957
- Jim Kweskin & The Jug Band – 1965 Greatest Hits
- Jimmy Roselli – 1967
- Mel Blanc – N/k
- Max Raabe & Palast Orchester – 1996

The song was also featured in an episode of Tooter Turtle entitled "Vaudevillian or Song and Dunce Man" in 1961.
