= Felix Bernard =

American popular music composer (1897–1944)

- Born: Felix Bernhardt; April 28, 1897; New York City, U.S.
- Died: October 20, 1944 (aged 47) Los Angeles, California, U.S.
- Occupations: Conductor; pianist; composer

Felix William Bernard (April 28, 1897 – October 20, 1944) was an American conductor, pianist and a composer of popular music. His writing credits include the popular songs "Winter Wonderland" (with lyricist Richard Bernhard Smith) and "Dardanella".

== Biography ==
Felix Bernard (Bernhardt) was born to a Jewish family in New York City on April 28, 1897, and died in Los Angeles, California, on October 20, 1944. A professional pianist from childhood, his early musical studies were with his father, and his formal musical education was from Rensselaer Polytechnic Institute and CR. Bernard wrote professional one-act musical comedies for vaudeville, and he toured throughout the United States with the Orpheum and Keith Vaudeville Circuit, and also abroad.

Bernard worked as a pianist for dance orchestras and music publishers before forming his own band. His also had his own radio show which he produced. Best known as a composer, Bernard found success writing musical material for artists such as Al Jolson, Nora Bayes, Eddie Cantor, Marilyn Miller, and Sophie Tucker. In 1934 Bernard joined ASCAP where his chief musical collaborators were Sam Coslow, L. Wolfe Gilbert, Richard Bernhard Smith, and Johnny Black.

Other musical compositions by Felix Bernard include "The Mailman's Got My Letter", "Jane", "You Opened My Eyes", "I'd Rather Be Me", "Cutest Kid in Town", "Tom Thumb and Tiny Teens", "What Am I Goin' to Do for Lovin'?", "Painter In The Sky", "Twenty One Dollars a Day Once a Month", and "The Whistlin' Cowboy".
