= Pietro Deiro =

Italian-American accordionist

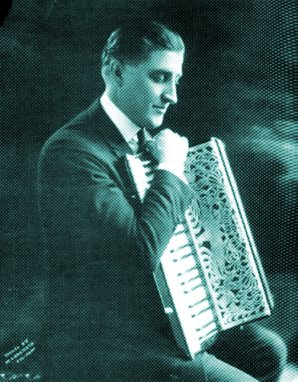
Pietro Deiro, c. 1920

Pietro Deiro (1888 – 1954) was one of the most influential accordionists of the first half of the 20th century.

Born on August 28, 1888, in Salto Canavese, Italy, the younger brother of Guido Deiro, Pietro Deiro emigrated to the United States as a steerage passenger on the S/S La Savoie in 1907 and went to live with his Uncle Frederico and work in the coal mines of Cle Elum, Washington.

Pietro Deiro began playing Diatonic button accordion professionally in a tavern in Seattle in 1908. Within a few months, his brother Guido Deiro (already an accomplished piano-accordionist in Europe) arrived in Seattle, and taught his brother how to play the piano accordion. Both brothers became minor celebrities on the vaudeville circuit; Guido in 1910 and Pietro at least by 1912.

Pietro Deiro recorded dozens of records for the Victor Talking Machine Company. After the demise of vaudeville during the Great Depression, he opened a successful accordion studio in Greenwich Village, New York City and established an accordion music publishing company: Accordion Music Publishing Company (AMPCO), later simply known as Pietro Deiro Publications.

Pietro Deiro was the first president of the American Accordionists Association (1938) and promoted himself as "The Daddy of the Accordion," much to his brother Guido's chagrin. Pietro died in 1954.

Deiro was survived by wife Bianca, daughter Blanche Pancotti and son Pietro Deiro Jr., who subsequently emerged as the editor of Pietro Deiro Publications and its catalogue of over 10,000 compositions ranging from educational materials, traditional ethnic music as well as concert works composed by such leading American composers as Virgil Thompson and Paul Creston. in addition, Pietro Deiro Jr. also continued his father's tradition of collaborating with the noted accordionists of his time. In 1960, he joined forces with Joe Biviano, Carmen Carrozza, Angelo Di Pippo, Eugene Ettore and John Serry Sr. to release a novel recording of classical music selections which were arranged for accordion orchestra on the Coral Records label.(Pietro Deiro Presents the Accordion Orchestra, Coral, CRL-57323)

== Commemorations ==
There has been a recent resurge of interest in the music of Pietro Deiro. In 1991 and 1992, composer/accordionist William Schimmel and his wife, dancer/choreographer/director Micki Goodman presented one of their major artistic collaborations: Opera Fisarmonica, a realization of the life and works of Pietro Deiro in extended opera form. It is a four-act opera devised and performed by Schimmel and Goodman, who did all of the singing, playing, movement, sets and lighting. It utilized the works of Pietro Deiro in a highly dramatized manner along with Schimmel's own music and continuity combined with Goodman's highly physicalized direction of movement. It was performed at the Sofian Theatre in New York and received praise and endorsement from Pietro Deiro Jr. (who attended the opening night) as well as a favorable review in The New York Times by Bernard Holland, which opened with the heading: "Accordionists' Patron Saint."

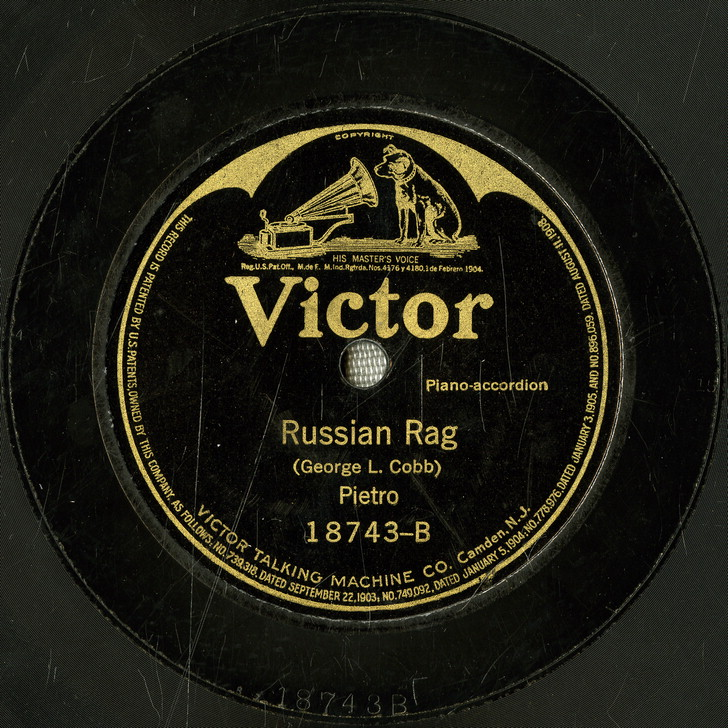
Victor 18743 Side B record label: Russian Rag, composed by George L. Cobb in 1918 and played by Pietro Deiro

In 2002, Museo Internazionale della Fisarmonica (The International Accordion Museum) of Castelfidardo, Italy, in collaboration with Music-tech, released a CD titled I Padri della Fisarmonica, vol. 1: Pietro Deiro, consisting of 23 original recordings by Pietro Deiro from 78 RPM records. In 2004, the Pietro Deiro Archives were donated to The Center for the Study of Free-Reed Instruments at the Graduate Center of the City University of New York by Pietro's granddaughters Sandra Cattani Deiro and Lynne C. Pancotti.

In 2005, American author and concert accordionist Henry Doktorski wrote the first biography of Pietro and Guido Deiro: The Brothers Deiro and Their Accordions (The Classical Free-Reed, Inc.) and in 2006 Doktorski recorded on CD the first volume of The Complete Works of Pietro Deiro: Celebrated Polkas (The Classical Free-Reed, Inc.). In 2007, Bella Musica of Roma, Italy, released a 6-CD set: L'abilita artistica di Pietro Deiro (The Complete Recorded Works of Pietro Deiro from 78 RPM Records) to commemorate the 100th anniversary of Pietro's arrival in the United States in 1907. (See external links below.)

On July 24, 25 and 26 2009, Dr. William Schimmel presented an audio/visual installation entitled 'Radiant Pietro', which consisted on an ambient soundtrack containing fragments of Pietro Deiro's entire musical output. Spectators were encouraged to page through a large, heavy book containing philosophical musings as well as slogans and pictures, the latter being vaudeville cutouts in black and white as well as color – showing Pietro Deiro in various degrees of headlessness – or disembodied – or simply a displaced head in other parts of the body and accordion. The mystical aspect of it is a sense of Radiance that comes through saintly martyrdom or simply allowing the music to enter the world forever through an "uncorking" process. As a result, we have Radiant Pietro – whose music will radiate through the aethers and the world forever. This installation was part of The American Accordionists' Association Master Class and Concert Series, The Seminars – The 2009 title being 'Welcome Home Skinny' – an anagram for 'Pietro's Return'. Dr. Schimmel is the moderator/curator for the series which just completed its fifteenth year.

Russian Rag
Accordion performance, played by Pietro Deiro

On July 30, 31 and August 1, 2010, Dr. William Schimmel supplied the score for an audio/visual installation by Cristine Speligene entitled Vesperae which consisted of rows of empty coffee cans with visual projections showing family and its relationship to coffee and caffeine. The score, although it contains some original music by Schimmel (At Least I Dropped Sorrow) and a quote from Charles Magnante (Accordiana), is largely devised from three Pietro Deiro compositions: Mancito (paso doble), El Cabrito (paso doble) and Arnilla (bolero). A simple cassette tape was placed into one the coffee cans producing a "tinny" yet "resonant" effect. This installation was part of The American Accordionists' Association Master Class and Concert Series, The Seminars – The 2010 title being 'Don't Like Opera'. Dr. Schimmel is the moderator/curator for the series which just completed its 16th year.

On July 31, 2016, Dr. William Schimmel performed his own 5-minute "House Version" of Pietro Deiro's Concerto in D – one of his last and largest compositions dating back to 1950. "House Version" meaning performed under a steady implied pulse and suitable for a dance club. This took place at the Tenri Cultural Institute of New York as part of the American Accordionists' Association Master Class and Concert Series, The Seminars – The Title being: No Place like Home. Dr. William Schimmel is Moderator and Curator of this series and this is the 22nd year.
