= Jean Gabriel-Marie =

French composer and conductor (1852–1928)

Jean Gabriel Prosper Marie (8 January 1852 – 29 August 1928), known professionally as Gabriel-Marie, was a French romantic composer and conductor.

== Biography ==
Gabriel-Marie was born in Paris, France, on 8 January 1852. He studied at the Conservatoire de Paris and held a prominent position in the local musical world. He died unexpectedly on 29 August 1928 in Puigcerdà, Girona, Spain.

He was the father of the composer Jean Gabriel Marie.

== Works ==
External audio
- You may hear Jean Gabriel-Mairie's "The Golden Wedding" performed by the Joe Biviano Accordion and Rhythm Sextette with John Serry and Tony Mottola in 1945; Here on Archive.org

Gabriel-Marie's works include La Cinquantaine ("The Golden Wedding", 1887) for cello and piano, for octet, and in various other arrangements. He also composed many dance pieces, notably the waltz Sous les firnes ("Under the Ash Trees", 1884) and the highly original polka Frais minois ("Fresh Face"). Sérénade Badine achieved some popularity by its numerous arrangements, including those for saxophone and piano, and cello and piano, as did other chamber works and light works for orchestra.

- Adagio for violin and piano
- Cassandre, Bouffonnerie
- Chanson Capriceuse for various instrumentations: cello or violin and piano; cello and orchestra
- Chant Pastoral for oboe and piano or orchestra
- En rêve, Esquisse symphonique for orchestra, or piano solo
- Frais minois ("Fresh Face")
- Furtivement, Impression musicale
- Impressions - Six Morceaux pour Violion et and Piano (1894, Schott Frères, Bruxelles)
1. Simplicité
2. Insouciance
3. Quiétude
4. Souvenir
5. Mélancolie
6. Allègresse
- Impromptu-valse for piano
- Intermezzo for various instrumentations: cello or violin and piano; cello and orchestra; piano solo
- La Soixantaine, Chers souvenirs
- 4 Morceaux for Cello and Piano
1. Dans le calme du soir, Mélodie
2. Fleur novelle, Romance
3. Radotages
4. Douce Rencontre
- Pasquinade for various instrumentations: cello (or violin, or viola, or mandolin, or flute, or oboe, or clarinet, or alto saxophone) and piano; cello and orchestra; piano solo; piano 4-hands
- 2 Pieces for cello and piano
1. Lamento (1887) for various instrumentations: cello (or violin, or viola, or flute, or clarinet) and piano
2. La Cinquantaine, Air dans le style ancien ("The Golden Wedding", 1887) for various instrumentations: cello (or violin, or viola, or mandolin, or flute, or oboe, or clarinet, or alto saxophone) and piano; cello and quintet; piano solo; piano 4-hands; organ; harmonium; orchestra; military band; voice and piano; 2 voices and piano
- 3 Pieces for cello and piano
1. Romance (also for violin and piano)
2. Sérénade badine (also for violin, viola, mandolin, flute, oboe, or clarinet and piano)
3. Tzigane, Mazurka (also for violin and piano, cello and orchestra, piano solo, and piano 4-hands)
- Près du Gourbi, Fantaisie arabe
- Renouveau for piano
- Rêverie for various instrumentations: cello (or violin, or viola, or mandolin, or flute, or oboe, or clarinet, or alto saxophone) and piano; cello and orchestra; piano solo; piano 4-hands
- Songe d'enfant for orchestra, or piano solo
- Sous les firnes ("Under the Ash Trees", 1884)
- Sur la route, Marche bohême
- Vieille histoire for various instrumentations: cello or violin and piano; cello and orchestra; chamber orchestra; piano solo; piano 4-hands
- Retraite Croate ("Croatian Retreat")
