= La Cinquantaine =

Musical composition

"La Cinquantaine" (French, IPA: /la sɛ̃.kɑ̃.tɛn/, transl. The Fiftieth Anniversary) is a piece of light music composed by Jean Gabriel-Marie around 1887. Described as an "air in the olden style" (French: Air dans le style ancien) in the original manuscript, it was originally written for cello with piano accompaniment, but has since been arranged for many other instruments.

"La Cinquantaine" is included in the Suzuki method Cello School, Volume 3, and is commonly performed by beginner Suzuki cello students.

== Popular adaptations ==
A swing arrangement of the work by James "Jiggs" Noble, recorded in New York City in late 1940 or early 1941 by Woody Herman and his orchestra as "Golden Wedding", became a 1941 hit and a jazz standard. The record is notable for its extended (34-bar) drum solo by Frankie Carlson. Other jazz versions, including those by Adrian Rollini, Barry Wood, and Raymond Scott, use the title "The Girl With The Light Blue Hair".

== Audio recordings ==
External audio
- Golden Wedding (1945), performed by John Serry Sr. and the Joe Biviano Accordion and Rhythm Sextette, on Archive.org

Classical
1947 – John Serry Sr. with Joe Biviano's Accordion & Rhythm Sextette on the album Accordion Capers for Sonora records.
1954 – John Serry Sr. performed/arranged the composition for accordion & his ensemble for RCA Victor.
Jazz
1941 – Woody Herman and his Orchestra, recorded NYC 13 February 1941. Personnel: John Owens, Steady Nelson, Cappy Lewis trumpets; Vic Hamman, Neil Reid, Bud Smith trombones; Woody Herman clarinet; Eddie Scalzi, Herb Tomkins alto saxes; Micky Folus, Saxie Mansfield tenor saxes; Tommy Linehan piano; Hy White guitar; Walter Yoder bass; Frank Carlson drums; re-released in UK on Brunswick LAT8092 (10" LP) 1955.
Herman and his orchestra featured in the 1942 film What's Cookin'?, playing "Golden Wedding", amongst other hits by them, as well as The Andrews Sisters and other contemporary musicians.
1948 – Adrian Rollini Trio, 1948 film by Video Varieties Corporation, New York, recorded as "The Girl with the Light Blue Hair" and described as "Swinging La Cinquantaine".
