= Leo Wood =

American songwriter and lyricist

Leo Wood (aka Jack Wood; né Leopold Wood Lantheaume; 2 September 1882 – 2 August 1929) was an American songwriter and lyricist.

== Career ==
Leo Wood was born in San Francisco to Louis Ferdinand Lantheaume and Hannah Marcuse Wood (maiden). He was known professionally as Leo Wood and Jack Wood.

Wood is best remembered as the songwriter of the 1920s hit "Somebody Stole My Gal". He wrote lyrics for many of the top songwriters of the day, including Theodore F. Morse. Other popular songs written by Wood include the Paul Whiteman jazz standard "Wang Wang Blues", "Runnin' Wild", and "Play that 'Song of India' Again", a number-one hit for five weeks for Whiteman in 1921. He also wrote "Mean Old Bed Bug Blues," under the pseudonym Jack Wood.

Leo Wood died at home in Teaneck, New Jersey, August 2, 1929.

== Audio samples ==
- "Mean Old Bed Bud Blues;" Bessie Smith (vocals); Porter Grainger (piano); Lincoln M. Conaway (Sterling's brother) (guitar); Columbia (catalog no. 14250D; matrix W144796-3); recorded September 27, 1927, New York

== Family ==
One of his sons was named Theodore Morse Lantheaume (1926–1972).
