= Jörgen Sundeqvist =

Swedish accordionist (born 1962)

Jörgen Sundeqvist (born 1962) is a Swedish accordionist. He toured the United States and Great Britain in 2006 with Øivind Farmen.
