= American Accordionists' Association =

- Formation: March 9, 1938
- Headquarters: Mt. Vernon, New York
- President: Frank Busso Jr.
- Affiliations: Confédération Internationale des Accordéonistes, International Music Council, National Music Council
- Website: www.AmerAccord.com

The American Accordionists' Association (AAA) is an American association dedicated to players of the accordion. It was established on March 9, 1938, and is currently based in Mt. Vernon, New York.

Pietro Deiro was the first president of the American Accordionists' Association.

The organization holds an annual accordion festival. In 1957, the AAA contracted American composer Paul Creston to write a piece for the instrument; Prelude and Dance for accordion (Op. 69) was published the following year. Since then more than 60 original works for accordion have been commissioned from more than 30 composers.
