= Forster Music Publisher, Inc. =

- Status: Defunct
- Founded: 1916; 109 years ago
- Founder: Fred John Adam Forster
- Country of origin: United States
- Headquarters location: Chicago
- Publication types: Sheet music

Forster Music Publisher, Inc. was a major American publisher of popular songs founded in 1916 in Chicago by Fred John Adam Forster (1878–1956). The company had an office in New York and its music was of the Tin Pan Alley genre. For most of its existence, the firm was located at 216 South Wabash, Chicago.

== History ==
Forster founded an earlier firm, F. J. A. Forster, in 1903 as a jobber in sheet music. In 1922, Forster merged F. J. A. Forster with Forster Music Publisher, Inc.

== Selected publications ==
- Chasing the Fox, Percy Wenrich (1922)
- Oh, Johnny, Oh, Johnny, Oh! music by Abe Olman, lyrics by Ed Rose (1917) – recorded by Bonnie Baker with the Orrin Tucker Orchestra (Columbia Records: over 1 million records sold)
- piano and vocal works by Louise Cooper Spindle

Songs by Charles L. Johnson

- Butterflies: Caprice (1908)
- Teasing the Cat (1916)
- Monkey-Bizniz: Novelty for Piano (1928)
- Pink Poodle One Step (1914)
- Blue Goose Rag (Johnson uses the pseudonym Raymond Birch) (1916)

== See also ==
- Charles L. Johnson, Fred Forster's closest business partner
- Raymond A. Sherwood, lyricist
