= Bing with a Beat =

Studio album by Bing Crosby
- Released: 1957
- Recorded: February 19–20, 1957
- Genre: Vocal
- Length: 37:44
- Label: RCA Victor

Bing Crosby chronology
High Society (1956)	Bing with a Beat (1957)	A Christmas Story - An Axe, An Apple and a Buckskin Jacket (1957)

Professional ratings
Review scores
Source	Rating
AllMusic	4/5 stars

Bing with a Beat is the twentieth solo studio album by American singer and actor Bing Crosby. It was Crosby’s seventh long play album but his first with RCA Victor. It was recorded at the Radio Recorders "Annex" Studio in Los Angeles and released on vinyl in September 1957. Bing with a Beat is a 1957 concept album where the songs feature "hot" jazz and dixieland arrangements by Matty Matlock, played by Bob Scobey's Frisco Jazz Band.

The album was issued on CD by BMG Music and Bluebird Records in 2004.

== Reception ==
Variety liked the album, saying, "Bob Scobey's Frisco Jazz Band has put Bing Crosby in one of his happiest and swingiest vocal frames. The evergreens are ever-bright when Crosby and Scobey match wits."

Record producer, Ken Barnes, wrote, "After his high-powered outing with Buddy Bregman, Bing probably felt a desire to get back to the roots of his singing style and this pleasantly swinging album with Bob Scobey's Frisco Jazz Band was probably the best artistic therapy for him at this point in his career. Bing always responded enthusiastically to a Dixie-style backing and with songs like 'Some Sunny Day', 'Whispering' and 'Mama Loves Papa' he is in top-notch form. Scobey plays some tasty trumpet and there are telling solos from others in the band - notably Ralph Sutton on piano. The cleanly crisp arrangements are by Matty Matlock and the album is almost a total joy from beginning to end. The only mild disappointment is a rather lack-lustre version of 'Mack the Knife' which should have been a standout.

The writer Will Friedwald, in his book Jazz Singing: America's Great Voices from Bessie Smith to Bebop and Beyond, commented, "Communicating the obvious joy the music arises in him, Crosby fairly oozes with charming insouciance above and beyond even the call of Crosby, expressed in semi-spoken asides and lyric alterations."

== Track listing ==
Side one
No.	Title	Writer(s)	Length
1.	"Let a Smile Be Your Umbrella"	Sammy Fain, Irving Kahal, Francis Wheeler	2:50
2.	"I'm Gonna Sit Right Down and Write Myself a Letter"	Fred E. Ahlert, Joe Young	3:03
3.	"Along the Way to Waikiki"	Richard A. Whiting, Gus Kahn	3:29
4.	"Exactly Like You"	Jimmy McHugh, Dorothy Fields	3:14
5.	"Dream a Little Dream of Me"	Fabian Andre, Wilbur Schwandt, Gus Kahn	2:40
6.	"Last Night on the Back Porch"	Carl Schraubstader, Lew Brown	2:48

Side two
No.	Title	Writer(s)	Length
1.	"Some Sunny Day"	Irving Berlin	2:46
2.	"Whispering"	John Schonberger, Richard Coburn, Vincent Rose	3:26
3.	"Tell Me"	J. Will Callahan, Max Kortlander	2:56
4.	"Mack the Knife"	Kurt Weill, Bertolt Brecht	3:53
5.	"Down Among the Sheltering Palms"	Abe Olman, James Brockman, Leo Wood	3:15
6.	"Mama Loves Papa"	Abel Baer, Cliff Friend	3:10

== Personnel ==
Bob Scobey (trumpet and leader), Frank Beach (trumpet); Abe Lincoln (trombone); Matty Matlock (clarinet); Dave Harris (tenor saxophone); Ralph Sutton (piano); Clancy Hayes (guitar); Red Callender (bass); Nick Fatool (drums).
