= I Like Men! =

I Like Men

Studio album by Peggy Lee
- Released: 1959
- Recorded: May 1959
- Genre: Vocal jazz
- Length: 28:39
- Label: Capitol ST 1131
- Producer: Dave Cavanaugh

Peggy Lee chronology
Miss Wonderful (1959)	I Like Men (1959)	Beauty and the Beat! (1959)

Professional ratings
Review scores
Source	Rating
AllMusic	3/5 stars

I Like Men! is a 1959 studio album recorded by American singer Peggy Lee, arranged and conducted by Jack Marshall.

== Track listing ==
1. "Charley, My Boy" (Ted Fio Rito, Gus Kahn) – 1:35
2. "Good-For-Nothin' Joe" (Rube Bloom, Ted Koehler) – 2:32
3. "I Love to Love" (Herbert Baker) – 2:51
4. "When a Woman Loves a Man" (Bernie Hanighen, Gordon Jenkins, Johnny Mercer) – 2:46
5. "I Like Men!" (Peggy Lee, Jack Marshall) – 2:06
6. "I'm Just Wild About Harry" (Eubie Blake, Noble Sissle) – 2:09
7. "My Man" (Jacques Charles, Channing Pollock, Albert Willemetz, and Maurice Yvain) – 2:13
8. "Bill" (Oscar Hammerstein II, Jerome Kern, P.G. Wodehouse) – 2:46
9. "So in Love" (Cole Porter) – 2:33
10. "Jim" (Caesar Petrillo, Edward Ross, Nelson Shawn) – 2:59
11. "It's So Nice to Have a Man Around the House" (Jack Elliot, Harold Spina) – 2:22
12. "Oh Johnny, Oh Johnny, Oh!" (Abe Olman, Ed Rose) – 1:47

== Personnel ==
- Peggy Lee – vocals
- Jack Marshall – arranger and conductor
