= Uncle Sammy, Take Care of My Girl =

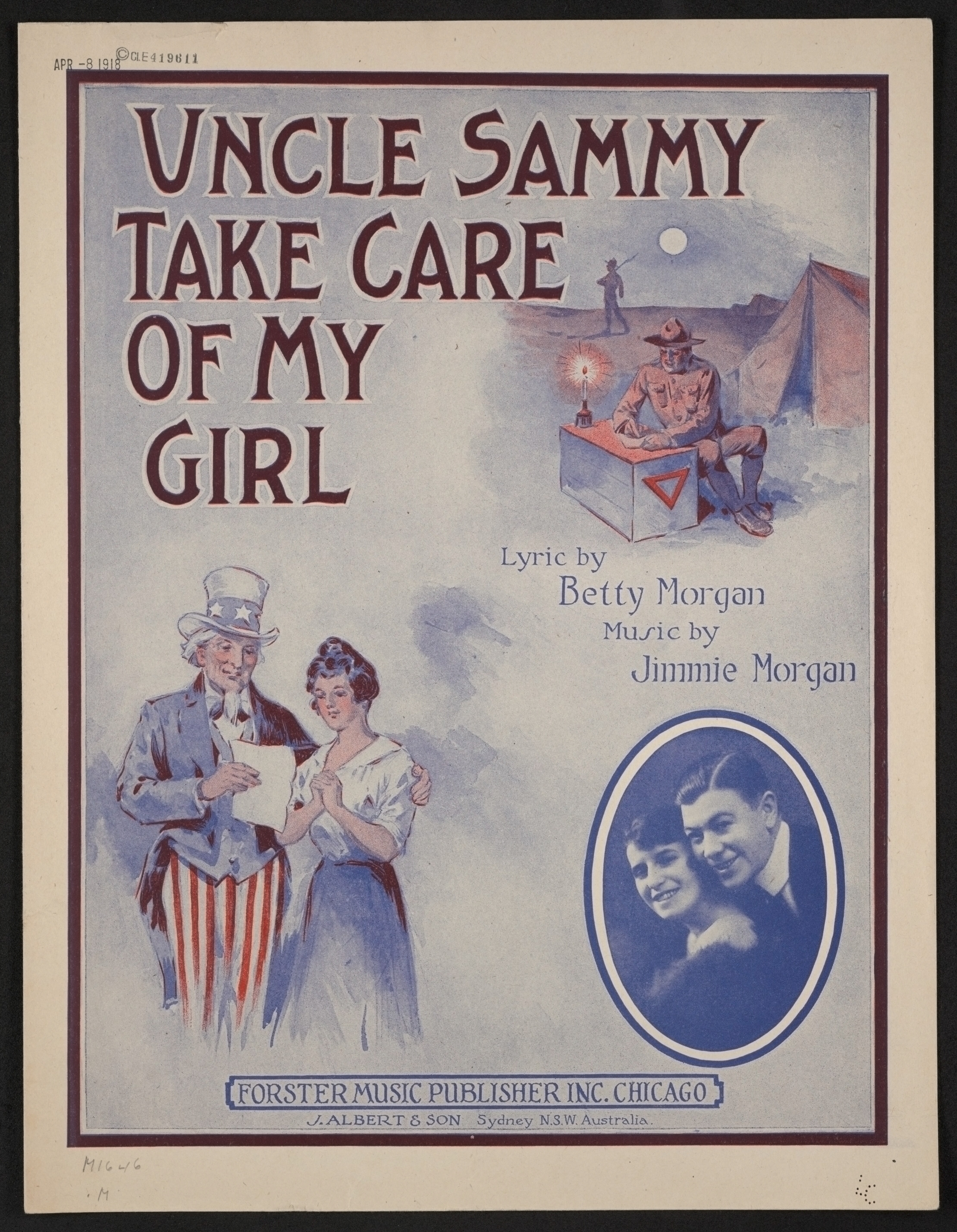

Song
- Released: 1918
- Label: Forster Music Publisher, Inc.
- Composer(s): Jimmie Morgan
- Lyricist(s): Betty Morgan

Uncle Sammy, Take Care of My Girl is a World War I song released in 1918. Betty Morgan wrote the lyrics. Jimmie Morgan composed the music. The song was published by F.J.A. Forster of Chicago. On the cover of the sheet music is a soldier in a trench, writing a letter. The smoke of the fire has a drawing of Uncle Sam reading the letter to a woman. There is also a photo of the lyricist and composer. Artist Dan Sweeney designed the cover. Another version of the cover shows a soldier in the upper right-hand side, writing a letter. In the lower left corner, Uncle Sam offers the letter to a woman. A photo of the lyricist and composer are also featured on the cover. It was written for both voice and piano.

The song is written from the first-person point of view of someone who recently read a soldier's letter. It was addressed to Uncle Sam. The chorus contains the pleas of the letter:

"Uncle Sammy, take care of my girl
While I'm over there,
Please treat her fair;
I'll do my bit and I won't mind
As long as you are kind
To the girl I left behind
I'll be thinking of her ev'ry day.
She's more precious to me than a pearl
And it may be some time
Before we get to the Rhine;
So, Uncle Sammy, take care of my girl."

The sheet music can be found at Pritzker Military Museum & Library.
