= The Battle Song of Liberty =

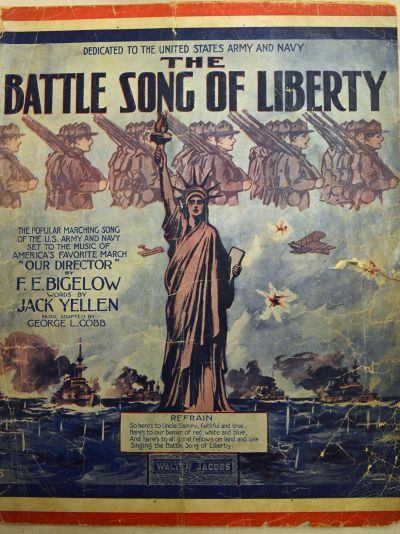
- Sheet music cover

Song
- Published: 1917
- Genre: War-time song
- Composer: George L. Cobb
- Lyricist: Jack Yellen

The Battle Song of Liberty is a World War I song written by Jack Yellen and composed by George L. Cobb, adapted from "Our Director" by F.E. Bigelow. The song was first published in 1917 by Walter Jacobs, in Boston, Massachusetts. The sheet music cover features the Statue of Liberty amid a sea battle with planes and marching soldiers in the background. It is dedicated to the US Army and Navy.

The sheet music can be found at the Pritzker Military Museum & Library.
