= While You're Over There in No Man's Land, I'm Over Here in Lonesome Land =

Song
- Language: English
- Published: 1918
- Songwriter(s): Lyricist: Jessie Spiess; Composer: Jack Stanley

While You're Over There in No Man's Land, I'm Over Here in Lonesome Land is a World War I song written by Jessie Spiess and composed by Jack Stanley. The song was first published in 1918 by Will Rossiter in Chicago, Il. The sheet music cover, illustrated by Starmer, features a woman knitting with a battle scene above.

The sheet music can be found at the Pritzker Military Museum & Library.
