= Gogo DeLys =

Canadian-born American singer (1908–2003)

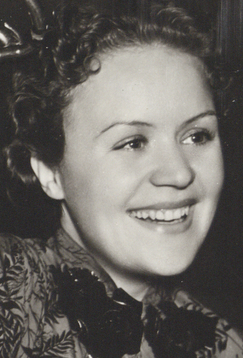
- Born: Marie Gabrielle Belanger; August 17, 1908; Edmonton, Alberta, Canada
- Died: February 19, 2003 (aged 94); Santa Monica, California, U.S.
- Occupation: Singer
- Spouse: Robert Redd
- Children: 1

Gogo DeLys (born Marie Gabrielle Belanger; August 17, 1908 – February 19, 2003) was an American singer in vaudeville and with the Jimmy Grier Band and on old-time radio. Her last name was also sometimes transcribed as Delys.

== Early years ==
Born in Edmonton, Alberta, Canada, DeLys performed in a talent show while she was a law student at USC. A talent scout saw her and turned her career plans from law to singing.

== Career ==
Dubbed "the Canadian Canary" by newspaper columnist Walter Winchell, DeLys was active professionally from the 1920s into the 1940s. In 1928, she performed in vaudeville shows headed by Eddie Peabody and Paul Ash.

Prior to January 1931, DeLys had moved from Vancouver to Los Angeles, singing on radio station KHJ, where Radio Digest magazine said, "she promptly became an instantaneous hit". By June 1931, DeLys had become the female vocalist with Georgie Stoll and his orchestra. The following year she sang with Jimmy Grier's orchestra. On October 29, 1932, she recorded "Second Hand Heart (for sale)" with Grier and his orchestra on the Victor label.

On radio, DeLys sang with Jerry Joyce's Boys. She also sang on Little Ol' Hollywood, and on Your Hit Parade, and Carefree Carnival.

In 1936, she had her own twice-weekly program on CBS, and, in 1937, she was featured with The Norsemen, James Melton, and Don Voorhees' orchestra in a series of transcribed programs sponsored by Rexall.

In July 1937, Mid-Summer Night's Serenade debuted on CBS with DeLys as its star. A review in the trade publication Radio Daily described the program as "a well-balanced 15 minutes of evening music ..."

== Death ==
On February 19, 2003, DeLys died of natural causes in St. John's Hospital in Santa Monica, California, at age 94.

== Personal life ==
DeLys retired after marrying Robert Redd. The couple had one child, actress Mary-Robin Redd.
