= Billy Baskette =

William James Baskette (October 20, 1884 – November 8, 1949) was an American pianist and composer who wrote popular songs of the Tin Pan Alley era. He also wrote one of the most successful World War I war songs, "Good Bye Broadway, Hello France".

Baskette was born in Henderson, Kentucky. His career in music began as a bassist in a circus band. He also was involved in vaudeville performances as a dancer and a pianist. Later, he became a staff composer for various music publishing firms in Chicago and New York City. He died in Culver City, California on November 8, 1949.

Baskette was a part of the Tin Pan Alley movement of music. In 1918, there was a focus on music called "goodbye songs" referring to U.S. soldiers who were deployed to France during World War I. One of Baskette's most notable works was "Goodbye Broadway, Hello France," which was a hit song of the period.

== Selected compositions ==
Leo Feist, Inc.

- "Hawaiian Butterfly", lyrics by George A. Little (1890–1946); music by Baskette & Joseph Santley (1917) OCLC 10531685
- "Goodbye Broadway, Hello France", C. Francis Reisner & Benny Davis; music by Baskette (1918) OCLC 78521206
- "Take a Letter To My Daddy Over There", lyrics by Roger Lewis & Bobby Crawford; music by Baskette (1918) OCLC 25693050
- "Jerry, You Warra A Warrior In the War", lyrics by Dannie O'Neil, music by Baskette (1919) OCLC 80134954

Shapiro, Bernstein & Co., New York

- "Baby's Prayer Will Soon Be Answered", lyrics & music by Baskette, Gus Van, & Joe Schenck (1918) OCLC 84880220 †

Berlin & Snyder, Inc.

- "Waiting for the Evening Mail", lyrics by James Barton, music by Baskette (1923) OCLC 54059456

H. Waterson, New York

- "Dream Pal", lyrics & music by Baskette (1925) OCLC 20597752

McCarthy & Fisher, Inc.

- "If We Had a Million Like Him Over There", lyrics & music by Baskette (1918) OCLC 47287112
- "I'm Goin' to Fight My Way Right Back to Carolina", lyrics & music by Baskette & Jessie Spiess (1918) OCLC 497716628
- "Everybody Wants a Key to my Cellar", Ed Rose, Baskette, & Lew Pollack (1919) OCLC 28269330

J. Albert & Son

- "Tell the Rose", lyrics & music by Baskette (1924) OCLC 221634448

Milton Weil Music Co., Chicago

- "Talking to the Moon", lyrics by George A. Little; music by Baskette (1926) OCLC 15736770
- "Let Me Spent the Journey's End With You", lyrics by Baskette, music by Paul Ash (1927) OCLC 29000202
- "Hoosier Sweetheart", lyrics & music by Joe Goodwin, Paul Ash, & Baskette; arr. by Rube Bennett (1927) OCLC 18901353
- "The Man In The Moon Told Me", lyrics & music by Baskette, Theo Alban (né Theophilus Lewis Alban; 1897–1951), & Paul Ash; arr. by Rube Bennett (1927)
- "My Secret of Happiness", lyrics & music by Baskette & Theo Alban (né Theophilus Lewis Alban; 1897–1951); arr. by Rube Bennett (1927)
- "Night Time in Picardy", lyrics & music by Baskette & Theo Alban (né Theophilus Lewis Alban; 1897–1951); arr. by Rube Bennett (1927) OCLC 498433510
- "Save a Little Girl For Me", lyrics & music by Baskette & Theo Alban (né Theophilus Lewis Alban; 1897–1951); arr. by Rube Bennett (1927)
- "Tune In To-Night", lyrics & music by Baskette, arr. by Rube Bennett (1927)
- "Right After They Leave My Arms", lyrics & music by Rube Bennett, Ed Rose, & Baskette (1927)
- "One Hour of Love", lyrics by Baskette, music by Rube Bennett (1927)
- "Dream Train", words by Charles Newman, music by Baskette (1928) OCLC 2220252

Harold Rossiter Music Co., Chicago

- "I Could Waltz On Forever With You Sweetheart", lyrics by Rube Bennett, music by Baskette (1927) OCLC 367816735
- "Ula-hoo", lyrics by Baskette, music by Rube Bennett (1927)
- "Love Is Like That", lyrics by Paul Ash, music by Baskette (1927) OCLC 498219305, 28095117, 498278363

C. Bayha Music, New York (Charlies Anthony Bayha; 1891–1957)

- "That's When I Learned To Love You", lyrics by Bartley Costello, music by Baskette (1929) OCLC 775676503

Harms, Inc.

- "The Perfect Dream", lyrics & music by Baskette & Theo Alban (né Theophilus Lewis Alban; 1897–1951) (1933) OCLC 498628674

Bobbins Music Corp., New York

- "Honolulu Sweetheart", lyrics & music by Baskette (1927)

Billy Baskette Music Co., New York

- "Old Shoes", lyrics & music by Baskette (1927); Helmy Kresa arranged for band OCLC 893482973

Publisher unknown

- "Forever and Ever and Ever", lyrics & music by Jesse Crawford, Baskette, & Bartley Costello (1929) OCLC 497422203

Mason Music Company, New York

- "The Blue Eagle Is Flying High", lyrics & music by Baskette & Theo Alban (né Theophilus Lewis Alban; 1897–1951) (1933)

Joe Davis, Inc., New York (Joseph Morton Davis; 1896–1978)

- "Carolina Lullaby", words and music by Cecelia G. Reeker (née Huenergardt; 1897–1981), Ed Rose, & Baskette (1933) OCLC 497309474, 671311436

Mort Beck Music Co.

- "Whistlin' Joe From Kokomo", lyrics & music by Baskette, Harry Edelheit, & Arthur Berman (1933) OCLC 497328130

† "Baby's Prayer Will Soon Be Answered" was written in 1918 in response to Baskette's earlier song "Just A Baby's Prayer at Twilight (For Her Daddy Over There)", a pair of late war songs hoping for a soldier's safe return.
