= Bonnie Baker =

Bonnie Baker may refer to:

- Bonnie Baker (baseball) (1918–2003), Canadian baseball player
- Bonnie Baker (singer) (1917–1990), American jazz and pop singer
