= Russian Rag =

Russian Rag is the title of several pieces of music:

- Russian Rag (1918) by George L. Cobb, based on Sergei Rachmaninoff's Prelude in C♯ minor
- Russian Rags, a series of pieces by Elena Kats-Chernin
