= Send Me a Line When I'm Across the Ocean =

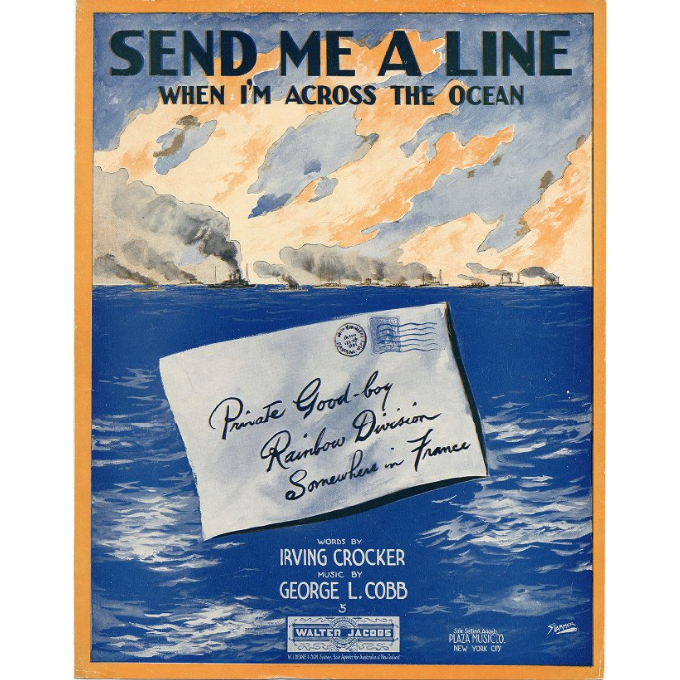

Song
- Released: 1917
- Label: Walter Jacobs
- Songwriter(s): Composer: George L. Cobb; Lyricist: Irving Crocker

"Send Me a Line When I'm Across the Ocean" is a World War I era song first released in 1917. Irving Crocker wrote the lyrics. George L. Cobb composed the music. It was written for both voice and piano. Walter Jacobs of Boston, Massachusetts published the song. The cover was designed by Rose Starmer. On the cover is a watercolor painting of an ocean with ships in the background. In the foreground is an envelope addressed: "Private Good-boy; Rainbow Division; Somewhere in France."

The song is told from the point of view of a soldier leaving for war. He gives instructions to those waiting for him at home: to write to him in order to keep his spirits up. The chorus is as follows:

Send me a line when I'm across the ocean
Send me a line to show me your devotion
A letter nice and long
As sweet as any song
To tell me that you'll remember
Ev'ry promise while I'm gone
Write me a word about my dear old mother
I know I'll miss her more than I can say
So while I'm over the sea
Just show your love for me
By sending a line to me each day

The sheet music can be found at Pritzker Military Museum & Library.
