= You're the One (1941 film) =

1941 film

- Theatrical release poster
- Directed by: Ralph Murphy
- Screenplay by: Gene Markey
- Produced by: Gene Markey
- Starring: Bonnie Baker; Orrin Tucker; Albert Dekker; Edward Everett Horton
- Cinematography: Ted Tetzlaff
- Edited by: Archie Marshek
- Music by: Phil Boutelje
- Production company: Paramount Pictures
- Distributed by: Paramount Pictures
- Release date: February 19, 1941
- Running time: 83 minutes
- Country: United States
- Language: English

You're the One is a 1941 American musical comedy film directed by Ralph Murphy and starring Bonnie Baker, Orrin Tucker, Albert Dekker and Edward Everett Horton. The film was released on February 19, 1941, by Paramount Pictures.

== Plot ==
Bonnie (Bonnie Baker) is a dour-faced hat-check girl at a hotel run by the imperious Edger Crump (Tom Dugan), when famous bandleader Orrin Tucker (himself) comes to the hotel to play a show. The performance is to be aired on radio station KXQZ, run by the slightly mad “Dr.” Colonna (Jerry Colonna), who is actually a garage mechanic who runs around wearing a stethoscope.

Trying to convince Tucker to let her sing with the band, Bonnie runs into singing star Luke Laramie (Albert Dekker), to whom she takes an instant dislike. Eventually, she convinces Tucker to let her sing on the air, thanks to the recommendation of Joe Frink (Edward Everett Horton), who was actually an old friend of her father's back in Texas.

But things go disastrously wrong when Luke finds he cannot sing due to a “voodoo curse” placed on him by Mme. Ziffnidyiff (Mariska Aldrich). Colonna fills in by singing “The Yogi Who Lost His Power”, but the crowd is unappreciative; one patron hurls an overripe pomegranate at Colonna's head, knocking him cold. Just when it looks like there'll be a riot live on the air, Bonnie steps in and sings the big number “You’re The One”, which gets a tremendous hand. Luke, his “curse” lifted, arrives and he and Bonnie sing “I Could Kiss You For That”, after which he kisses her. The whole cast sings “Strawberry Lane” into the closing credits.

== Cast ==
- Bonnie Baker as Bonnie Baker
- Orrin Tucker as Orrin Tucker
- Albert Dekker as Luke Laramie
- Edward Everett Horton as Death Valley Joe Frink
- Lillian Cornell as Miss Jones
- Renie Riano as Aunt Emma
- Jerry Colonna as Dr. Colonna
- Teddy Hart as Julius, Luke's Chauffeur
- Tom Dugan as Edgar Crump
- Walter Catlett as Program Director
- Charles Lane as Announcer
- Don Castle as Tony Delmar
- Mariska Aldrich as Mme. Ziffnidyiff
- Eddie Conrad as Mr. Ziffnidyiff
- Marie Blake as Beauty Shop Operator
- Hal K. Dawson as Male Secretary
- June Gaude as Beauty Shop Manager
- Gerald Oliver Smith as Hotel Clerk
- Sammy Cohen as Bellboy
- Gilbert Wilson as Hotel Clerk
- Foy Van Dolsen as Chester Pugh
- Florine McKinney as Archery Girl

== Reception ==
Bosley Crowther of The New York Times reviewed the musical negatively, criticizing it as "perilously close to being the most haphazard, pointless and dull motion picture shown on Broadway this season." He specifically critiqued the acting of Bonnie Baker and Orrin Tucker as being lackluster, and Jerry Colonna and Edward Everett Horton's roles for engaging in "meaningless and unfunny business".

== Bibliography ==
- Fetrow, Alan G. Feature Films, 1940-1949: a United States Filmography. McFarland, 1994.
