= Oh Johnny, Oh Johnny, Oh! =

1917 song by Abe Olman and Ed Rose

"Oh Johnny, Oh Johnny, Oh"

Single by Orrin Tucker and His Orchestra, vocal Bonnie Baker
- B-side: How Many Times
- Published: February 7, 1917 by Forster Music Publisher, Inc., New York
- Recorded: August 20, 1939
- Studio: CBS Columbia Square Studio, Los Angeles, California
- Genre: Popular music, Big Band
- Length: 2:39
- Label: Columbia 35228
- Composer: Abe Olman
- Lyricists: Ed Rose aka Edward Smackels, Jr.

"Oh Johnny, Oh Johnny, Oh!" is a song composed by Abe Olman (1887–1984), lyricized by Ed Rose (pseudonym for Edward Smackels Jr.; 1875–1935), and published by Forster Music Publisher, Inc. The music was copyrighted 7 February 1917 and the copyright was renewed 29 December 1944. Under the Copyright Term Extension Act (1998), the sheet music is in the public domain, as is all music published in the U.S. prior to 1923. Its melody and structure form the basis of a self-calling circle dance, using square dance steps and popular in summer camps.

== Lyrics ==
Original lyrics, 1917, by Ed Rose

1st verse (16 bars, 2/4, E♭ Major)

All the girls are crazy about a certain little lad,
Al-tho he's very, very bad,
He could be, oh, so good when he wanted to
Bad or good he understood 'bout love and other things,
For every girl in town followed him around,
Just to hold his hand and sing:

Chorus (32 bars)

Oh, Johnny! Oh, Johnny!
How you can love!
Oh, Johnny! Oh, Johnny!
Heavens above!
You make my sad heart jump with joy,
And when you're near I just
Can't sit still a minute. I'm so,
Oh, Johnny! Oh, Johnny!
Please tell me dear.
What makes me love you so?
You're not handsome, it's true,
But when I look at you,
I just, Oh, Johnny!
Oh, Johnny! Oh!

2nd verse

Johnny tried his best to hide from every girl he knew,
But even this he couldn't do,
For they would follow him most everywhere,
Then his friends got him to spend a week or two at home
It's worse now than before, 'cause the girl next door hollers thru the telephone:

(chorus)

World War I patriotic version, 1917, lyrics added by Raymond A. Sherwood

Verse

Uncle Sam is calling now for ev'ry mother's son
To go get behind a gun and keep Old Glory waving on the sea
Now prepare to be right there to help the cause along
To every chap you meet when you're on the street
You can sing this little song:

Chorus

Oh, Johnny, oh Johnny, why do you lag?
Oh, Johnny, oh Johnny, run to your flag
You're county's calling can't you hear?
Don't stay behind while others do all the fighting, Start to
Oh, Johnny! Oh, Johnny! Get right in line,
And help to crush to foe.
You're a big husky chap,
Uncle Sam's in a scrap, You must!
Go, Johnny! Go, Johnny! Go!

Self-Calling circle dance version, date unknown

(To the chorus melody)

Well, you all join hands as you circle the ring
Stop where you are, give your honey a swing
Swing that little gal behind you
Swing your own, if you have time when you get home
Allemande left with the corner gal
Do-si-do with your own
Then you all promenade
With the sweet corner maid
Singing "Oh, Johnny! Oh, Johnny! Oh!"

== Inspiration for the song ==
According to an August 1945 United Press article, Ed Rose wrote the song when his friends, Mr. and Mrs. John Hansen of Akron, Ohio, began dating while attending college in Indiana. They were so conspicuously in love that Rose, also their classmate, wrote the song about them and presented them with the original manuscript.

== Notable recordings ==
- Premier Quartet

Blue Amberol Records, wax cylinder (1917) OCLC 39869865

- The Andrews Sisters with the Vic Schoen Orchestra

2840 Decca, 78 rpm; 10 inch (1939) OCLC 166342298
Recorded November 9, 1939, New York City
Side A matrix 66498
Audio sample

- Bonnie Baker with Orrin Tucker and His Orchestra

Columbia, 78 rpm; 10 inch (1939)
Recorded August 20, 1939, Los Angeles
Side A — vocal version by Bonnie Baker
Side B — instrumental version by Orin Tucker and His Orchestra
Audio sample
Pop hit on the Billboard Charts for 14 weeks, quickly became the top-selling record for the Columbia Recording Corporation, with 1.5 million records by the end of 1940

- Peggy Lee with orchestra conducted by Jack Marshall

Album: I Like Men!
Capitol Records, 33 1/3 rpm, 12 inch (April 1959) OCLC 26592062 stereo OCLC 10894054 mono
Recorded 1959
Audio sample

- Ella Fitzgerald and Her Famous Orchestra

NBC broadcasts OCLC 811140658
Recorded January 25, 1940, at the Savoy, New York

- Kathy Linden released a version of the song as a single in 1958 entitled "Oh Johnny, Oh!".

== Filmography ==
- Oh, Johnny, How You Can Love (1940 film), directed by Charles Lamont, Universal Pictures
- Spotlight Scandals (1943 musical film), directed by William Beaudine

Starring Billy Gilbert, Bonnie Baker, Harry Langdon

- Swing Shift Cinderella (1945), directed by Tex Avery

Sung as "Oh, Wolfy" by Red (voiced by Imogene Lynn) as Cinderella

- The Chronicles of Narnia: The Lion, the Witch and the Wardrobe (2005 film)

During the scene when the children are playing hide and seek — when Lucy goes through the wardrobe

- "Blitz" (2024 film)

== Original publications ==
- Oh Johnny, Oh Johnny, Oh, OCLC 741366211

== Sheet music (public domain) ==
See sheet music collections:

- Indiana University Bloomington — IN Harmony: Sheet Music from Indiana
- University of Southern California — USC Music Library: Sheet Music Catalog
