= James Brockman =

- Born: Jacob Brachman; December 8, 1886; Russian Empire
- Died: May 22, 1967 (aged 80) Santa Monica, California, United States
- Genres: Broadway musicals, revues, show tunes
- Occupations: Songwriter, composer

James Brockman (December 8, 1886 – May 22, 1967) was an American songwriter. Born in Russia, he emigrated to New York by himself at the age of 9 or 10. His given name was Jacob Brachman but he changed the spelling of the last name because it was mis-pronounced and the rest of the family followed with the change.

Brockman began his career as a comedian in vaudeville and musicals in the early 1900s. He was a partner, along with James Kendis, of the Kendis-Brockman Music Company.

He wrote the lyrics to Down among the Sheltering Palms with music by composer and Chicago music publisher Abe Olman. Oldman's marketing of the song led to Leo Feist acquiring it and encouraging Al Jolson to perform on stage. Brockman co-wrote the World War I song "Berlin bound".

In 1919, he was a co-writer of the song "I'm Forever Blowing Bubbles", which years later would become the anthem of the English football club West Ham United. Also in 1919, he co-wrote "I'm Like a Ship Without a Sail". He also co-wrote, with Abe Olman, the song "Down Among The Sheltering Palms", published in 1914 and popularized by the Boswell Sisters in the early 1930s.

He went on to work in Hollywood as a songwriter for films, and wrote the score for Happy Days. He died in Santa Monica, California in May 1967, aged 80, and was inducted into the Songwriters Hall of Fame in 1970.
