= Millard Haywood =

American painter (1853–1911)

Millard C. Haywood (Saline, Michigan, 31 August 1853 – 1911) was an American painter. When he was about six years old, his parents moved to Kansas, locating near Topeka. He received a good common school education, graduating at the High School of Vassar, Michigan. He then studied painting at the Pennsylvania Academy of Fine Arts at Philadelphia. He returned to Topeka in 1881 and began painting and selling portraits and landscapes.

Haywood spent the last decade of his career living in Norfolk, Virginia where he specialized in landscape art. He has an extensive inventory listed with the Smithsonian, and his most famous painting of "Doc Brown" hangs in the Kansas City History Museum.

== Works ==
- Portrait of cakewalker Joseph "Doc" Brown, 1896, in Kansas City Museum
