= Down Among the Sheltering Palms =

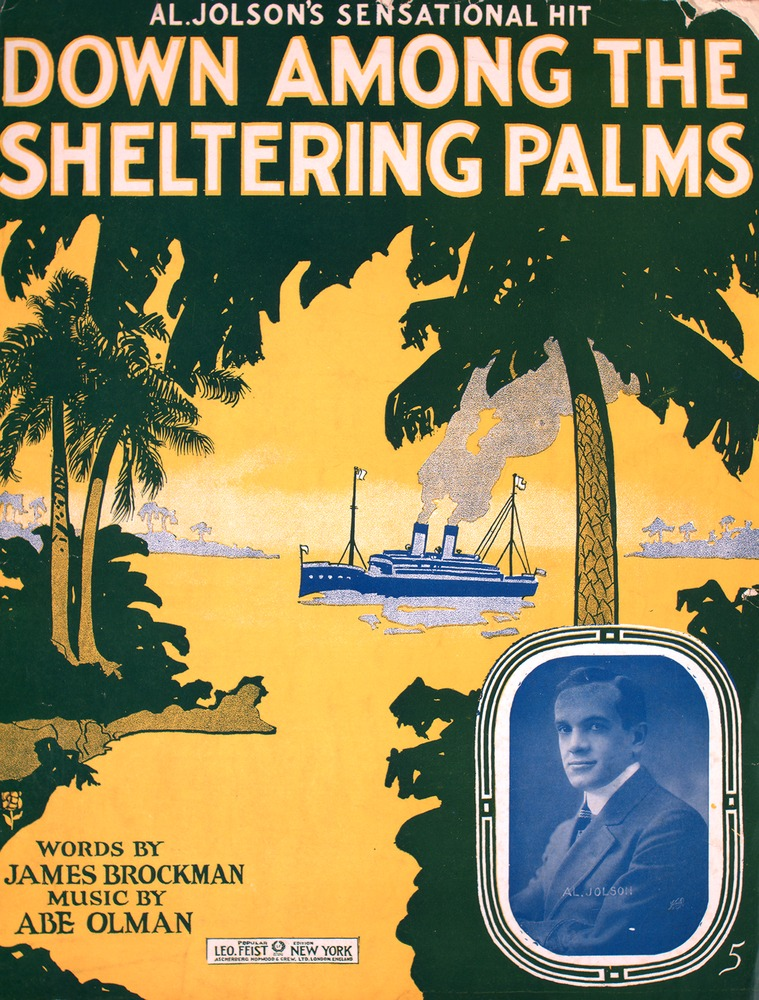
- Sheet music cover, 1914

Song
- Composer: Abe Olman
- Lyricist: James Brockman Leo Wood

Audio sample
- Recording of Down Among the Sheltering Palms, performed by the Lyric Quartet (1915): file; help

"Down Among the Sheltering Palms" is a popular song.

The music was written by Abe Olman, the lyrics by James Brockman and Leo Wood. The song was published in 1914 by Olman, who heavily marketed it in the Chicago region. Music publisher Leo Feist acquired it from Olman and gave it to Al Jolson to perform on stage.

The song was a hit for the Lyric Quartet (comprising Harry Macdonough, Olive Kline, Reinald Werrenrath and Elsie Baker) in 1915 and has since become a pop standard recorded by many artists.

== Notable recordings ==
- 1932 Boswell Sisters - recorded August 6, 1932, with The Dorsey Brothers Orchestra.
- 1947 Swing and Sway with Sammy Kaye, featuring vocals by Don Cornell, the Three Kaydets and Kaye Choir, recorded it in New York City on December 2, 1947. It was released by RCA Victor Records as catalog number 20-3100B (in United States) by EMI on the His Master's Voice label as catalog number MH 97. It reached the No. 14 spot in the USA charts.
- 1948 Al Jolson and The Mills Brothers - recorded December 8, 1948
- 1949 Johnny Mercer and The Pied Pipers.
- 1957 Bing Crosby for his album Bing with a Beat.

== Film appearances ==
- 1949 - That Midnight Kiss - sung by the G. I. Quartette
- 1953 - Down Among the Sheltering Palms - featured in this musical comedy when it was sung by Gloria DeHaven.
- 1959 - Some Like It Hot - performed by Society Syncopators.
