= Good Bye Broadway, Hello France =

1917 song composed by Billy Baskette

"Good-Bye Broadway, Hello France"
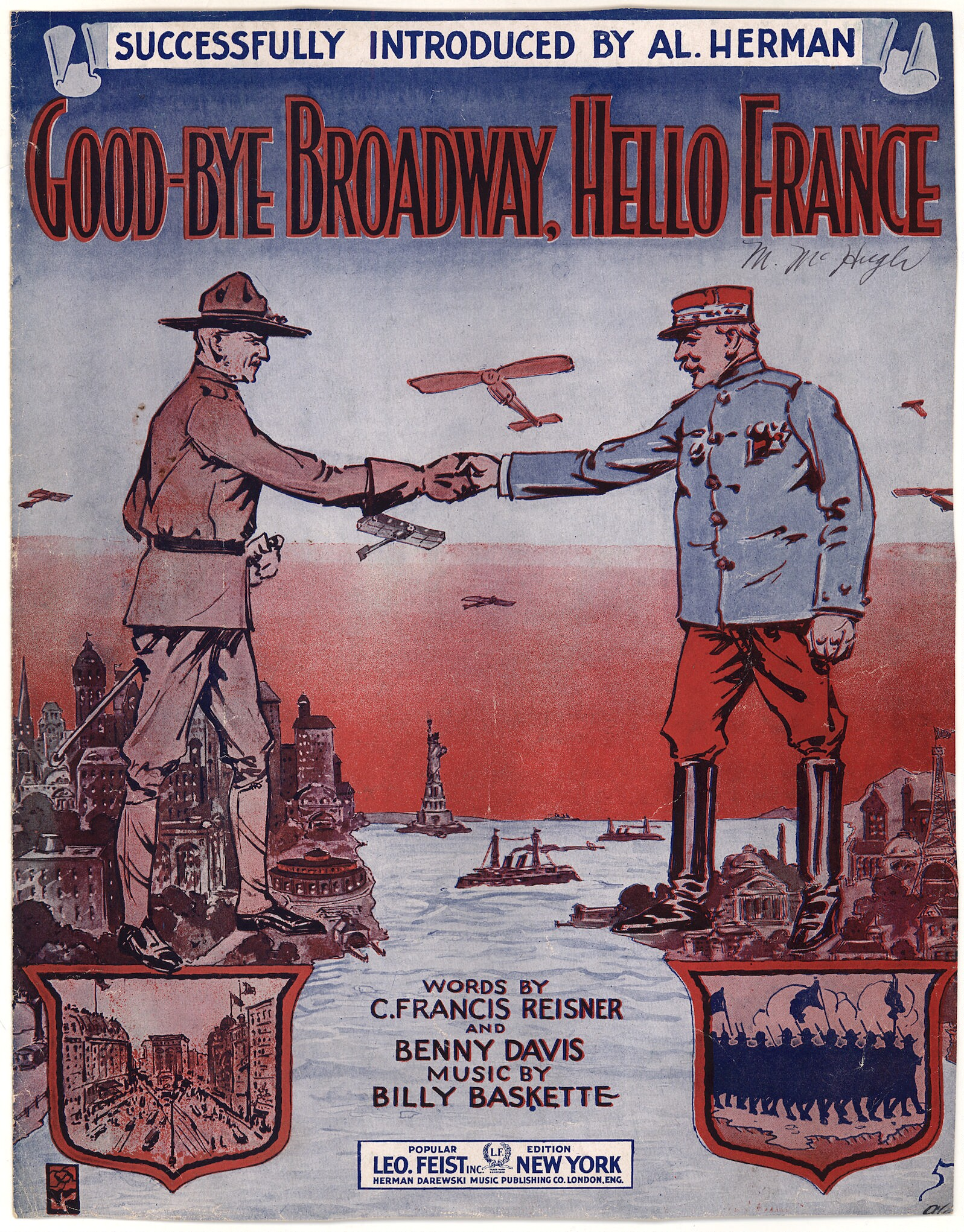
- Sheet music cover

Song
- Published: 1917
- Composer: Billy Baskette
- Lyricists: C. Francis Reisner, Benny Davis

Good-Bye Broadway, Hello France is a 1917 song composed by Billy Baskette, with lyrics written by C. Francis Reisner and Benny Davis. The song was published by Leo Feist, Inc.

== Performances ==
The song was included in The Passing Show of 1917 as part of the finale.

The song was performed by The American Quartet and reached No. 1 on the top 100 songs of 1917. Other covers include those by The Peerless Quartet, (No. 5 on 1917 top 100), Arthur Fields (1917), and Jaudus' Society Orchestra (1918).

The song inspired Irving Berlin's 1918 hit, "Goodbye, France," a song about leaving France to return to the United States.

While the song was popular during its time, it also saw a revival during World War II, where some soldiers preferred World War I songs over the war songs being produced at the time. Some soldiers changed the lyrics of the song depending on which frontline they were at. For example, if an American soldier landed on the beaches of Normandy during Operation Overlord or southern France during Operation Dragoon, the song was called "Goodbye Broadway, Hello France", if an American Soldier was fighting in Italy then the song would be called "Goodbye Broadway, Hello Italy". "Goodbye Broadway, Hello Holland or Goodbye Broadway, Hello Netherlands" was sung by American Airborne troops who landed in Holland during Operation Market Garden. "Goodbye Broadway, Hello Belgium" was sung during the Battle of the Bulge. "Goodbye Broadway, Hello Germany" was sung by American Soldiers who are fighting in Germany from the Battle of the Hurtgen Forest to the Crossing of the Rhine in 1945. If an American Soldier was fighting in the Pacific then it would depend on where they were, for example, The China Burma India theater, New Guinea, the Philippines, etc or they would simply sing "Goodbye Broadway, Hello Japan.

== In film ==
The song was used in Tin Pan Alley, a 1940 musical film.

In 1942, the song was featured in the film For Me and My Gal starring Judy Garland and Gene Kelly.

== Sheet music ==
The sheet music was reprinted more than ten times.

== Cover art and analysis ==
The 1917 publication featured an illustration cover by Rosenbaum Studios, which featured John J. Pershing and Joseph Joffre shaking hands across the ocean with the Statue of Liberty and the Eiffel Tower in the background.

On the back of one of the song edition's cover was an ad by Leo Feist which declared "MUSIC WILL HELP WIN THE WAR!", as well as an essay by "A. Patriot" which explained the meaning of the song. The song was meant to lift the nation's spirit and fight off fatigue and worry by promoting the American war effort in Europe.

== See also ==
- List of best-selling sheet music
