= Charles L. Johnson =

American composer (1876–1950)

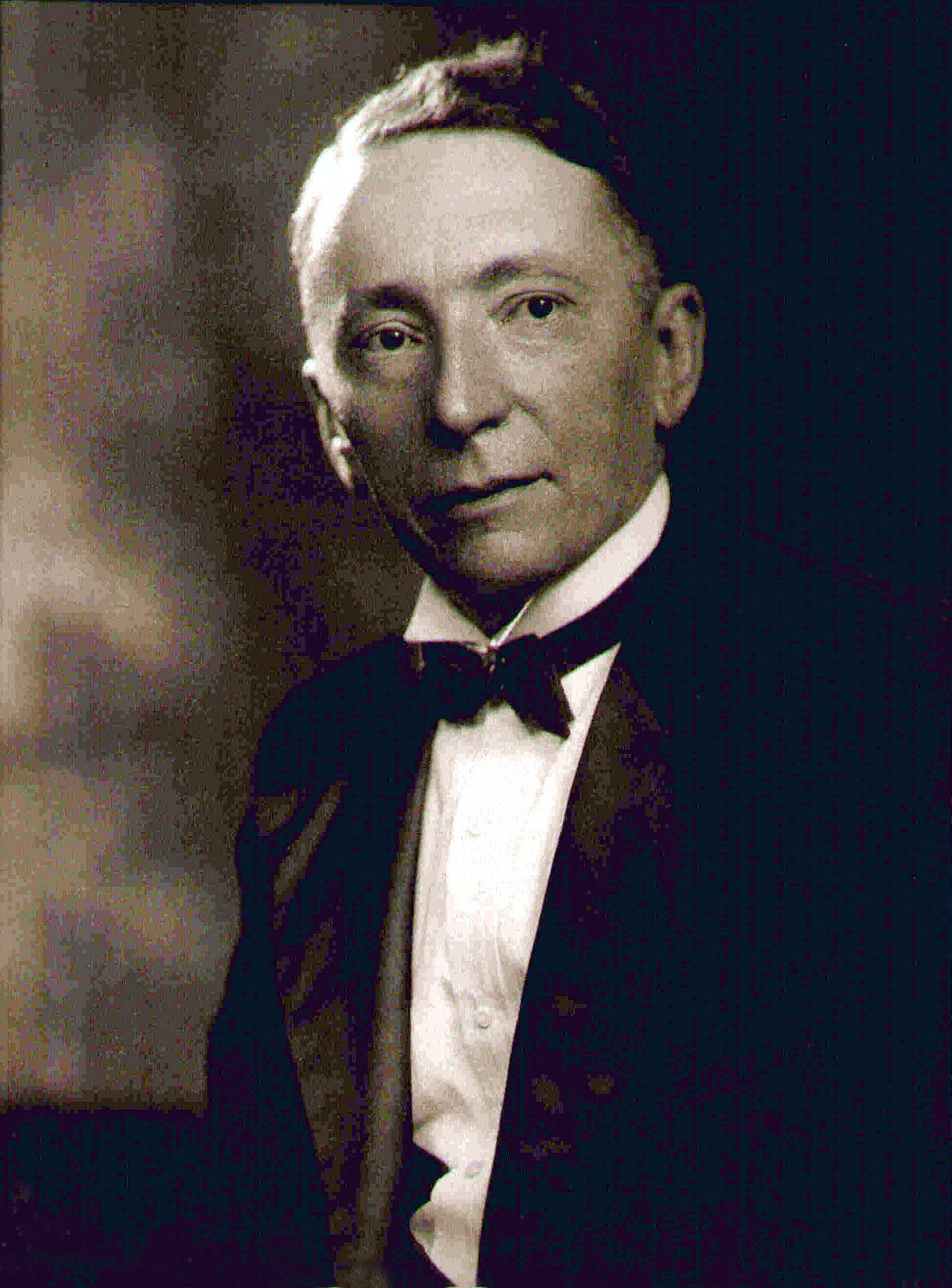
- Portrait, 1916

Background information
- Born: Charles Leslie Johnson; December 3, 1876
- Origin: Kansas City, Kansas, U.S.
- Died: December 28, 1950 (aged 74)
- Genres: Ragtime, march, waltz, tango, and song
- Occupation: Composer
- Instruments: piano, guitar, violin, banjo, mandolin
- Years active: 1900–1945

Charles Leslie Johnson (December 3, 1876 - December 28, 1950) was an American composer of ragtime and popular music. He was born in Kansas City, Kansas, died in Kansas City, Missouri, and lived his entire life in those two cities. He published over 300 songs in his life, nearly 40 of them ragtime compositions such as "Doc Brown’s Cakewalk", "Dill Pickles", "Apple Jack (Some Rag)", and "Snookums Rag". His best selling piece, a sentimental ballad called "Sweet and Low", sold over a million copies. Experts believe that had Johnson lived and worked in New York, he would be included alongside Scott Joplin, James Scott, and Joseph Lamb as one of the greatest ragtime composers. He wrote more than the other three combined and exemplified a greater range of talent, composing waltzes, tangos, cakewalks, marches, novelty pieces, and other types of music popular at that time.

== Early life and education ==
Johnson was born in the Armourdale district of Kansas City, Kansas to James R. and Helen F. Johnson. Clearly a prodigy, he was playing a neighbor's piano by age six and began studying classical piano, harmony, and music theory a few years later. Although he had classical training, he always preferred the popular music of the day. His musical ability led him to proficiency on other instruments as well: guitar, violin, banjo, and mandolin. As a young man Johnson became involved in the music scene of Kansas City by participating in several local groups. In this environment he wrote his first compositions.

== Personal life ==
"Cloud Kisser"
Johnson's "Cloud Kisser", published in 1911 under the stage name of Raymond Birch.

Johnson was married twice, first to Sylvia Hoskins in 1901, and they had a daughter Frances. The marriage ended in unclear circumstances; the ultimate fates of Sylvia or Frances are unknown. He married his second wife, Eva Otis, in 1926. She remained with him until his death in 1950.

== Musical career ==
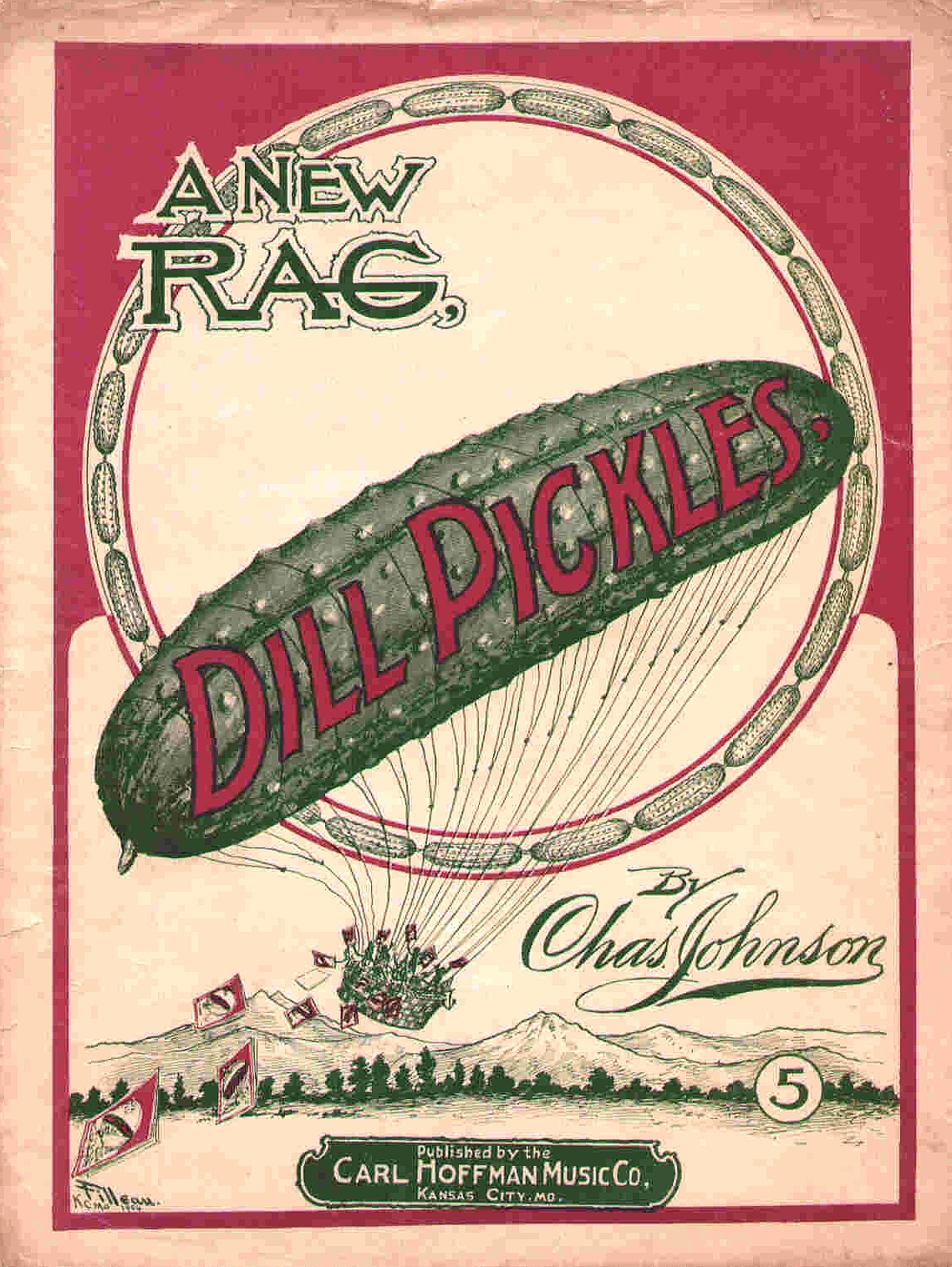
Sheet music cover for Johnson's "Dill Pickles", 1906

Johnson's career was stable and prolific. He began work in the late 1890s for the J.W. Jenkins and Sons Music Company in Kansas City, Missouri plugging songs and playing piano. Over the next five years Jenkins would publish twelve of Johnson's songs. Eventually Johnson would compose for many other publishers. By 1907, Johnson had also formed his own publishing company, putting out his own music and those of other local composers. In addition, Johnson began vanity publishing for others, often writing music for the lyrics of others or simply arranging others’ compositions. His closest business partnership was with Fred John Adam Forster of the Forster Music Publisher, Inc. Although Johnson's career would wax and wane with the economy of the turn of the century, World Wars I and II, and the Depression, Charles always had work and could always respond to the musical climate of the U.S.

At some point in his career Johnson began writing under pseudonyms. He used Raymond Birch the most, penning several of his well-known rags under that name such as "Blue Goose Rag", "Melody Rag", and "Powder Rag". But he also used several others.

Under any name, however, Johnson was a significant contributor to the Ragtime Era and to rag music in general. By far the biggest hit of 1906 was Charles’ most successful rag "Dill Pickles". The first rag to sell a million copies was Scott Joplin's "Maple Leaf Rag"; the second was "Dill Pickles". It has been suggested that by 1906 ragtime was already beginning to wane. After the publication of "Dill Pickles" there was a revival of interest in ragtime that extended its life by nearly ten more years. This piece of music made use of the “three over four” syncopation that was subsequently copied and used in dozens of rags by other composers. Joplin himself had difficulty getting away from its conventions.

As mentioned before, Johnson had a remarkable ability to reflect the needs and trends of the time. A clear example of this was in his war pieces. During his musical career Charles wrote pieces for the Spanish–American War, World War I, and World War II. Certainly most of these pieces (numbering almost 20) responded to the patriotism of U.S. soldiers in World War I. Among these pieces were "GoodBye Susanna", "Be a Pilgrim (And Not a Ram)", "We Will Follow the Red, White, and Blue", and "We Are All in the Same Boat Now".

== See also ==
- List of ragtime composers
