= Doc Brown (dancer) =

American dancer and champion cakewalker (c. 1835 – 1905)

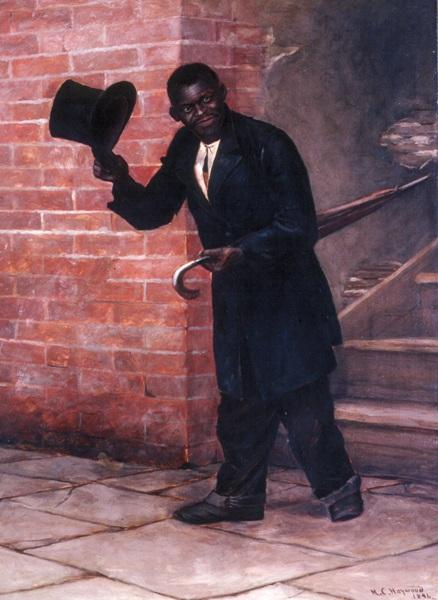
M.C. Haywood's Portrait of Joseph "Doc" Brown

William Henry Joseph Cutter Brown (c. 1835 – February 28, 1905), known as Joseph "Doc" Brown was an American dancer and champion cakewalker. Doc Brown was born into slavery in 1835 and died of tuberculosis in February 1905. While it is said one of his local neighbors filmed Brown's Cake Walk performances, any film is yet to be found. Apart from his well-known dance skills, he was known throughout Kansas City for his politeness and manners, causing him to leave a lasting influence on the local community. He is commemorated in the ragtime tune Doc Brown's Cake Walk by Charles L. Johnson.

An 1896 portrait of Doc Brown by the African-American painter M. C. Haywood hangs in Kansas City Museum.
