= Down Among the Sheltering Palms (film) =

1953 film by Edmund Goulding

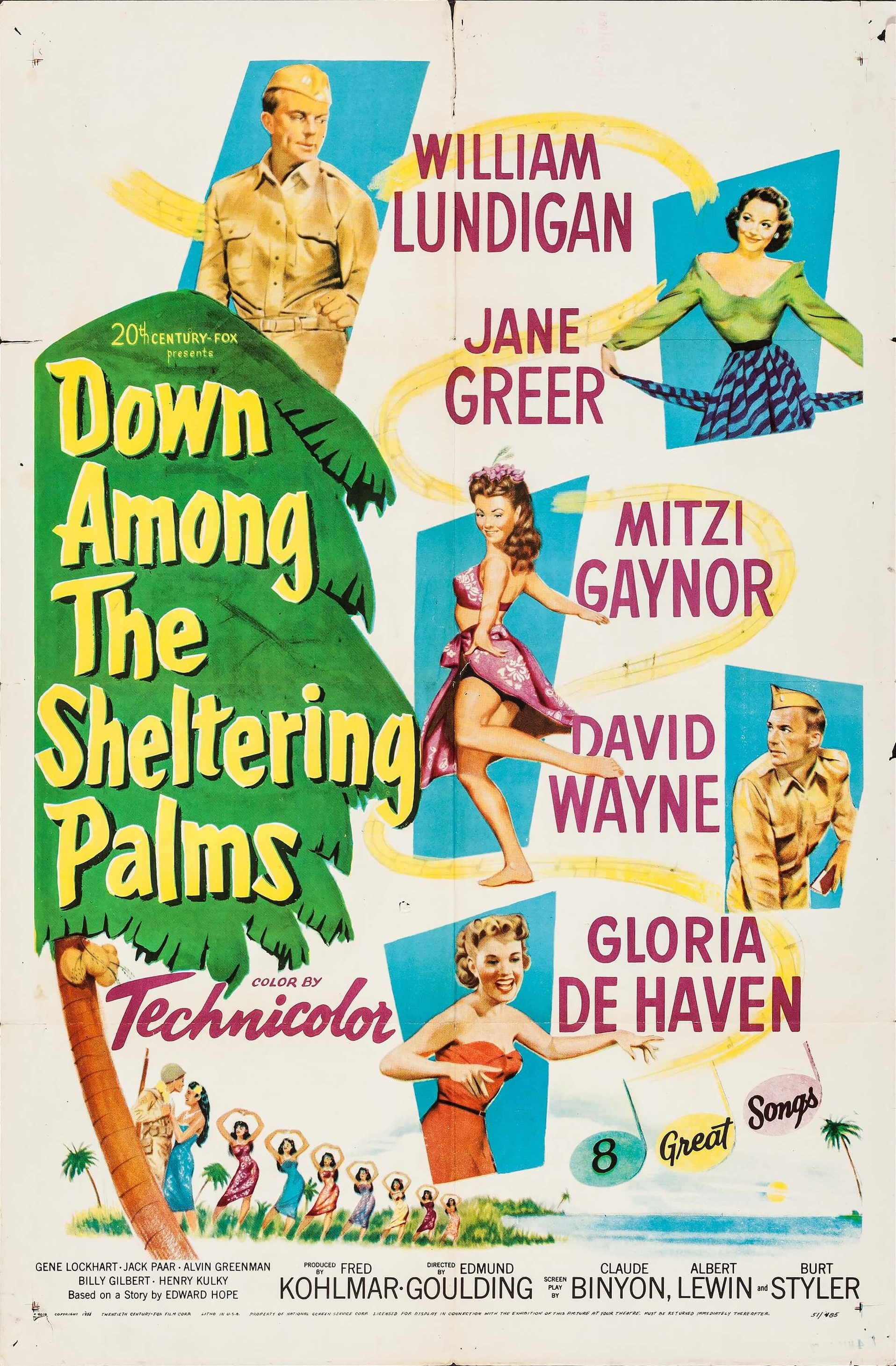
- Film poster
- Directed by: Edmund Goulding
- Written by: Claude Binyon; Albert E. Lewin; Burt Styler
- Produced by: Fred Kohlmar
- Starring: Mitzi Gaynor; William Lundigan; Jane Greer; Gloria DeHaven
- Cinematography: Leon Shamroy
- Edited by: Louis R. Loeffler
- Music by: Leigh Harline, Harold Arlen
- Production company: 20th Century Fox
- Distributed by: 20th Century Fox
- Release dates: March 1, 1953 (United States); March 27, 1953 (Los Angeles)
- Running time: 87 minutes
- Country: United States
- Language: English
- Budget: $1.4 million
- Box office: $1 million (US rentals)

Down Among the Sheltering Palms is a 1953 American musical comedy film starring Mitzi Gaynor, William Lundigan, Gloria DeHaven, David Wayne and Jane Greer. The popular song of the same name, which dates to 1914, is one of those performed in the film.

== Plot ==
World War II is coming to an end, but rather than being sent home, Capt. Bill Willoby and Lt. Frank Schmidt, along with their unit, are assigned to Midi Island, formerly held by the Japanese. They receive a friendly welcome there from King Jilouili and many native girls.

Willoby declares fraternization with the natives off-limits, which becomes awkward when the King presents him with beautiful Rozouila as a token of his appreciation. Rozouila is to be the captain's wife.

Rev. and Mrs. Edgett have arrived with niece Diana Forrester, who is hired by Schmidt to be his secretary. Willoby goes to the reverend for advice and is told to keep Rozouila in a separate quarters at all time.

Major Curwin visits the isle next, accompanied by Angela Toland, an attractive correspondent. Angela immediately makes a play for Willoby, observed by two jealous women, Rozouila and Diana, who are both relieved when Willoby rejects her advances. An angry Angela writes a false story claiming the captain is romantically involved with a native girl, which causes Willoby's men to turn against him.

A colonel investigates the news story and Willoby could face a court-martial. But a way is figured out for the captain to give Rozouila back to her island boyfriend with no loss of honor. Angela's story is revealed to be a lie. Midi is reclassified as a "friendly island" by the military, permitting fraternization by the soldiers. Willoby now loves Diana, though, while a chastised Angela has her eye on Lt. Schmidt.

== Cast ==
- Mitzi Gaynor as Rozouila
- William Lundigan as Capt. Willoby
- David Wayne as Lt. Schmidt
- Jane Greer as Diana
- Gloria DeHaven as Angela
- Gene Lockhart as Rev. Edgett
- Lyle Talbot as Maj. Curwin
- Jack Paar as Lt. Sloan

== Songs ==
- "Down Among the Sheltering Palms" (sung by Gloria DeHaven)
- "The Friendly Islands" (Arlen/Blane) (sung by chorus)
- "The Drum Chant" (danced by Mitzi Gaynor)
- "I'm a Ruler of a South Seas Island" (Arlen/Blane) (sung by William Lundigan and David Wayne)
- "Who Will It Be When the Time Comes?" (Arlen/Blane) (sung by Jane Greer)
- "What Make De Diff'rence?" (Arlen/Blane) (sung by Mitzi Gaynor)
- "All of Me" (sung by Gloria DeHaven)
- "27 Elm Street" (Arlen/Blane) (sung by chorus)
- "When You're in Love" (Arlen/Blane) (sung by Gloria DeHaven)
