= Berlin Bound =

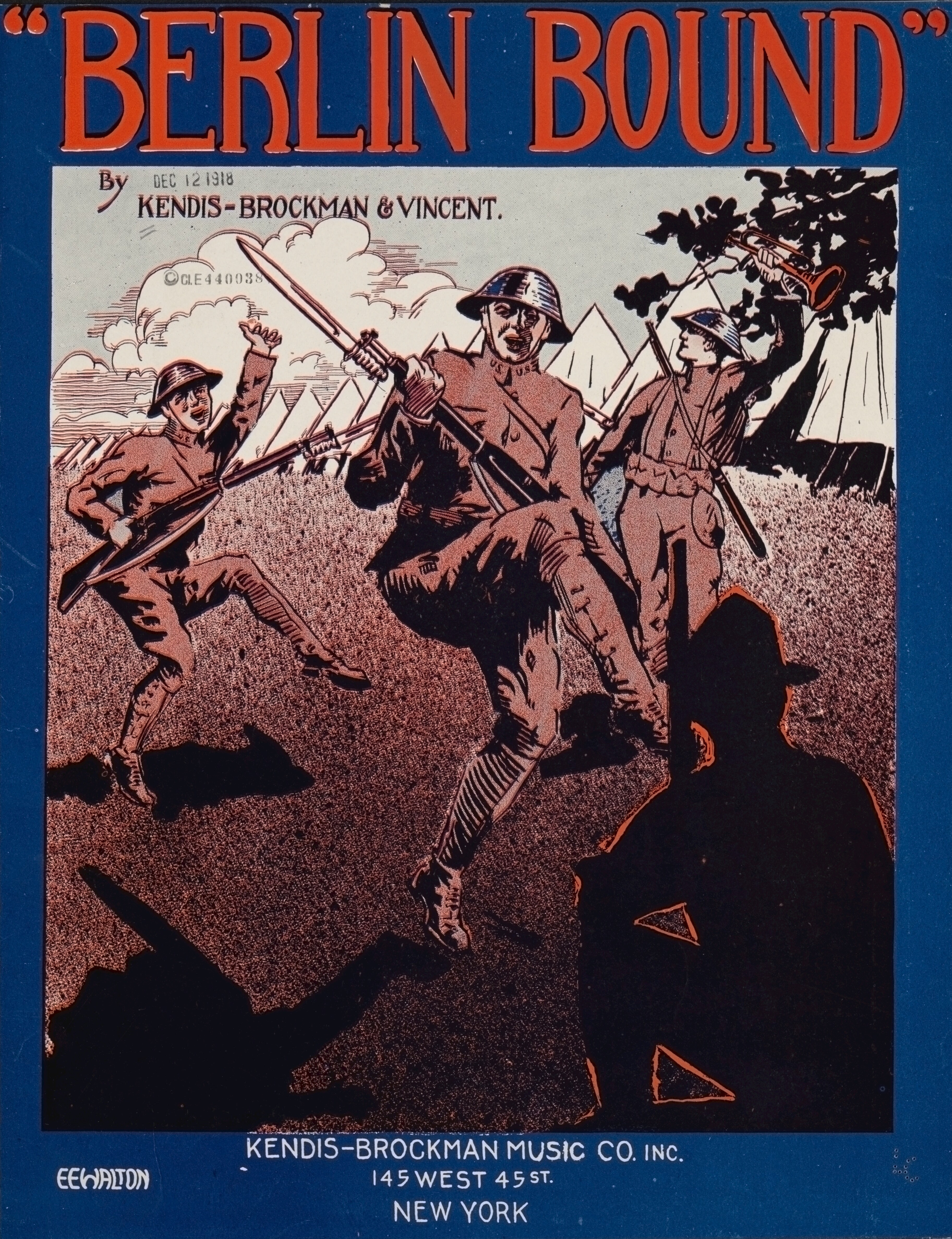

Song
- Published: 1918
- Songwriters: James Kendis, James Brockman, and Nat Vincent
- Producer: Kendis Brockman Music Co.

Berlin Bound is a World War I song written in 1918. The lyrics and music were written by James Kendis, James Brockman, and Nat Vincent. Kendis Brockman Music Co. published the song in New York, New York. On the cover of the sheet music is a drawing of soldiers dancing. The piece was written for both voice and piano.

The lyrics urge listeners to learn the "dance" known as "Berlin Bound," which the soldiers learned how to do in France. The chorus entails the steps of the dance, which reads more as a descriptor of a soldier's movements in battle:

First bend down low with your gun in hand
Roll your eyes over "No Man's Land"
Wait until you get that "Go" command
Then get yourself a Louie, blooey, blooey, blooey
Rush him, crush him, treat him rough
Kick him all around
Make him whistle Yankee doodle Doo
Wipe him off the map before you're through
Then you know you're positively, absolutely Berlin Bound
