= Baby's Prayer Will Soon Be Answered =

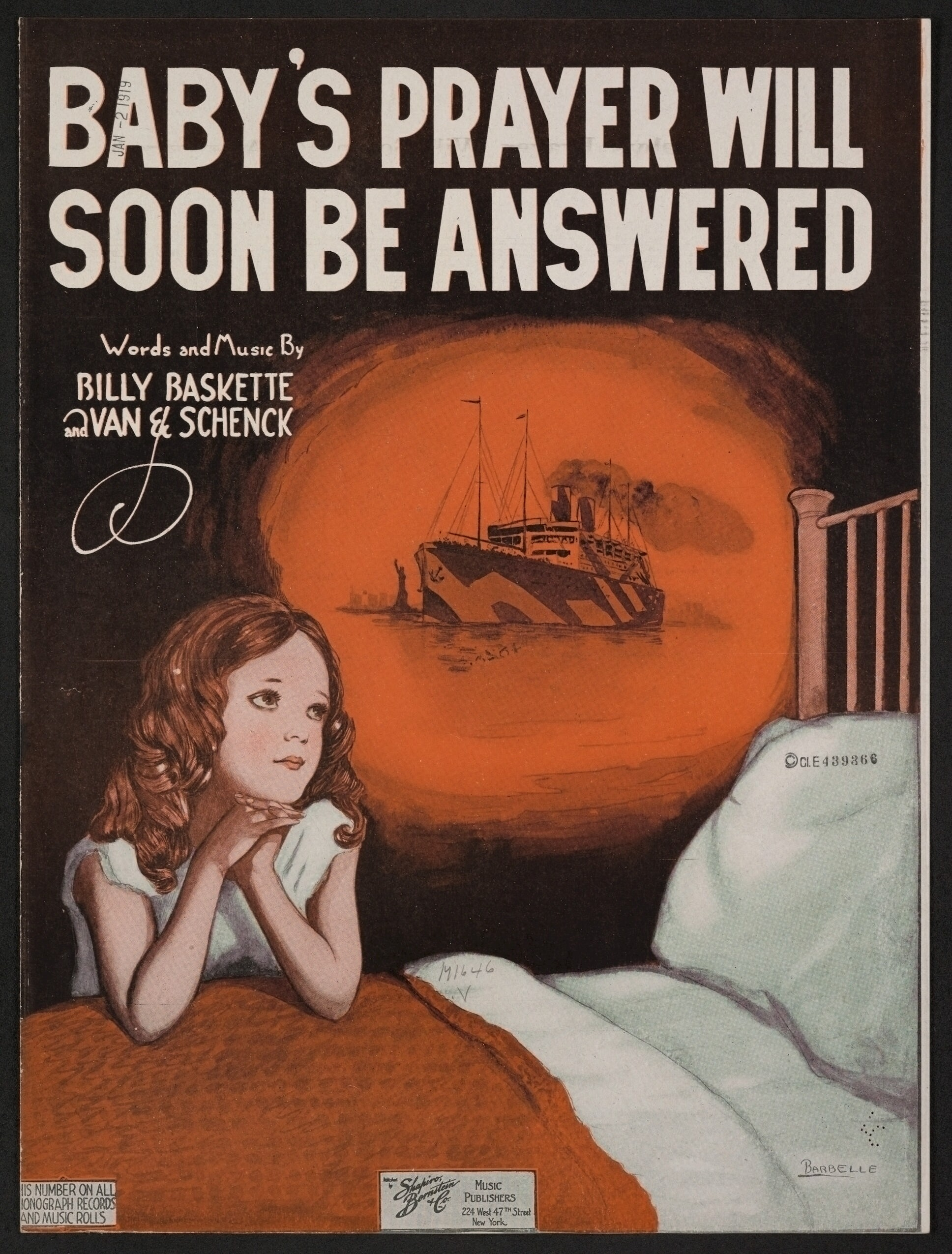
- Sheet music cover for "Baby's Prayer Will Soon Be Answered"

Song
- Published: 1918
- Songwriter(s): Billy Baskette, Van & Schenck

Baby's Prayer Will Soon Be Answered is a 1918 song written during World War I and performed by Henry Burr. The music and lyrics were written by Billy Baskette and Van & Schenck, and it was published by Shapiro, Bernstein & Co. Based on the sales, it reached an approximate peak position of No.2 on the Top 100 US songs of its time.

The song was arranged for a piano, and is set to a moderato tempo. The lyrics tell of a devoted daughter waiting patiently and praying for her father to return safely from the war. The song's cover art depicts a young woman kneeling by her bed as a ship enters the harbor.
