= Jack Yellen =

Polish-American lyricist and screenwriter (1892–1991)

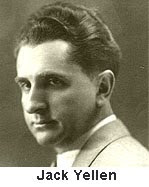
- 1924

Background information
- Born: Jacek Selig Jeleń; July 6, 1892; Raczki, Congress Poland, Russian Empire
- Died: April 17, 1991 (aged 98) Springville, Concord, New York, United States
- Occupations: Lyricist, screenwriter
- Years active: 1915–1969
- Spouse(s): Sylvia Stiller, Lucille Hodgeman (Stage Name: Lucille Day)

Jack Selig Yellen (Jacek Jeleń; July 6, 1892 – April 17, 1991) was an American lyricist and screenwriter. He is best remembered for writing the lyrics to the songs "Happy Days Are Here Again", which was used by Franklin Roosevelt as the theme song for his successful 1932 presidential campaign, and "Ain't She Sweet", a Tin Pan Alley standard.

== Early life and education ==
Born to a Jewish family in Raczki, Congress Poland, then part of the Russian Empire, Yellen emigrated with his family to the United States when he was five years old. His parents were Abram and Bessie Yellen. The oldest of seven children, he was raised in Buffalo, New York, and began writing songs in high school. He graduated with honors from the University of Michigan in 1913 where he was a member of the Pi Lambda Phi fraternity.

After graduating he became a reporter for the Buffalo Courier, continuing to write songs on the side.

== Career ==
Yellen's first collaborator on a song was George L. Cobb, with whom he wrote a number of Dixie songs including "Alabama Jubilee", "Are You From Dixie?", and "All Aboard for Dixieland". He is best remembered for his collaboration with composer Milton Ager. He and Ager entered the music publishing business as part owners of the Ager-Yellen-Bornstein Music Company. Yellen also worked with many other composers such as Sammy Fain and Harold Arlen.

Yellen's collaboration with Sophie Tucker, a vaudeville star for whom he was retained to write special material, produced one of Tucker's most well known songs, "My Yiddishe Momme". Yellen's lyrics, in English with some Yiddish text, were set to music by Lew Pollack. Yellen wrote the lyrics to more than 200 popular songs of the early 20th century. Two of his most recognized songs, still popular in the 21st century, are "Happy Days Are Here Again" and "Ain't She Sweet".

Yellen's screenwriting credits included:

Title	Year	Role
George White's Scandals	1934	Music composition and additional dialogue
Pigskin Parade	1936	Co-writer
Little Miss Broadway	1938	Co-writer
Submarine Patrol	1938	Co-writer

== Awards and legacy ==
Yellen was one of the earliest members of the American Society of Composers, Authors and Publishers (ASCAP) and served on its board of directors from 1951 to 1969. In 1972 he was inducted into the Songwriters Hall of Fame, and the Buffalo Music Hall of Fame in 1996.

The foundation created by Yellen and his second wife, The Lucille and Jack Yellen Foundation, established the ASCAP Foundation Lucille and Jack Yellen Award, an annual award for "aspiring musical theater lyricist or film scorer who exemplifies talent and career potential".

== Personal life ==
In August 1922, Yellen married 21-year-old Sylvia Stiller of Buffalo. They had two children, David and Beth. In 1944 he married his second wife, Lucille Hodgeman, who was born in Minnesota in 1915 and raised in Los Angeles. As a dancer and choreographer, she worked with Metro-Goldwyn-Mayer and 20th Century Fox under the stage name Lucille Day on over 20 films, including The Wizard of Oz. They lived for many years on a farm on Mortons Corners Road in Concord, New York. Jack Yellen died April 17, 1991, in Concord at the age of 98. Lucille Yellen died on August 15, 2010, at age 95.

== Broadway musicals ==
- What's in a Name? (1920) with music by Milton Ager
- Rain or Shine (1928) with music by Milton Ager
- John Murray Anderson's Almanac (1929)
- Follow A Star (1930) with music by Vivian Ellis
- You Said It (1931)
- George White's Scandals of 1935
- George White's Scandals of 1939
- Boys and Girls Together (1940)
- Sons o' Fun (1941)
- Ziegfeld Follies of 1943 (1943)

== Film scores ==
- The Adding Machine 1969
- The Affair of Susan 1935
- Ali Baba Goes to Town 1937
- Another Thin Man 1939
- Artistic Temper 1932
- Bells of Capistrano 1942
- Blonde Crazy 1931
- Broadway Melody of 1938 1937
- Bulldog Drummond 1939
- Call of The West 1930
- Captain January 1936
- Chasing Rainbows 1930
- The Christmas Party 1931
- Crashing The Gate 1934
- George White's Scandals 1934 1935
- Glad Rag Doll 1929
- Going Hollywood 1933
- Happy Landing 1938
- The Heart of New York 1932
- Hell In The Heavens 1934
- Hold That Co-Ed 1938
- Honky Tonk 1929
- King of Burlesque 1936
- The King of Jazz 1930
- Little Miss Broadway 1938
- Love Is News 1937
- My Lucky Star 1938
- Night and Day 1946
- Our Little Girl 1935
- Pigskin Parade 1936
- Rain or Shine 1930
- Rebecca of Sunnybrook Farm 1938
- Sally, Irene and Mary 1938
- Sensations of 1945 – 1944
- Sing, Baby, Sing 1936
- Submarine Patrol 1938
- The Ice Follies of 1939
- They Learned About Women 1930
- This Is Heaven 1929
- Twentieth Century 1934
- Unexpected Uncle 1941
- Wake Up and Live 1937
- You Can't Have Everything 1937

== Selected songs ==
- "Alabama Jubilee" – 1915
- "Are You from Dixie ('Cause I'm from Dixie Too)" – 1915
- "Dancing 'Round the U.S.A" - 1915
- "There's a Garden in Hawaii" with music by George B. McConnell – 1917
- "The Battle Song of Liberty" - 1917. m: George L. Cobb
- "Johnny Get Your Gun and Be a Soldier" - 1917. m: Jack Glogau
- "Over the Rhine" - 1917. m: Albert Gumble
- "So Long Sammy" - 1917. m: Albert Gumble
- "There's a Vacant Chair in My Old Southern Home" - 1917. m: Al. Piantadosi
- "When It's Circus Day Back Home" - 1917. m: Jack Glogau
- "There's a Lump of Sugar Down in Dixie" - 1918. m: Albert Gumble
- "We're Coming from Cody" - 1918. m: Pvt. Harry Wessel
- "I'm Waiting For Ships That Never Come In" – 1919, recorded by Moon Mullican in 1958.
- "Alexander's Band Is Back in Dixie" - 1919. m: Albert Gumble
- "The Cootie Tickle (Over Here It's the Shimmie Dance)" - 1919. m: Abe Olman
- "Don't Put a Tax on the Beautiful Girls" - 1919 with Milton Ager
- "Johnny's in Town" - 1919. m: Geo. W. Meyer & Abe Olman
- "Down By The O-Hi-O" – 1921. m: Abe Olman
- "Louisville Lou" – 1923
- "Mama Goes Where Papa Goes" – 1923
- "Big Bad Bill (Is Sweet William Now)" – 1924
- "Hula Lou" – 1924
- "Hard Hearted Hannah (The Vamp Of Savannah)" – 1924
- "I Wonder What's Become of Sally" – 1924
- "Cheatin' on Me" – 1925
- "In Your Green Hat" – 1925
- "My Yiddishe Momme" – 1925 with music by Lew Pollack and a huge success for Sophie Tucker.
- "No Man's Mama" – 1925 with music by Lew Pollack
- "Crazy Words, Crazy Tune" – 1926
- "Ain't She Sweet" – 1927
- "Glad Rag Doll" – 1929
- "Happy Feet" – 1930
- "Happy Days Are Here Again" – 1930
- "Are You Havin' Any Fun?" – 1939 with music by Sammy Fain
- "Life Begins At Forty" – 1937 music and lyrics by Jack Yellen and Ted Shapiro, recorded by Sophie Tucker.
