= Johnny's in Town =

"Johnny's In Town"
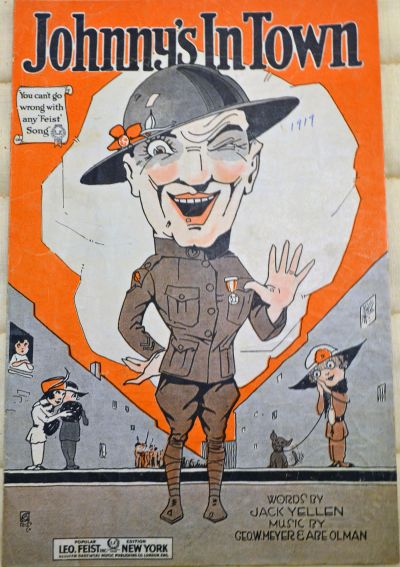
- Sheet Music cover

Song
- Language: English
- Published: 1919
- Songwriter(s): Lyricist: Jack Yellen; Composer: George W. Meyer & Abe Olman

Johnny's in Town is a World War I song written by Jack Yellen and composed by George W. Meyer & Abe Olman. This song was published in 1919 by Leo. Feist, Inc., in New York, NY. The sheet music cover, illustrated by Rosenbaum Studios, depicts a cartoon soldier winking with women in the background.

The sheet music can be found at the Pritzker Military Museum & Library.
