= Spotlight Scandals =

1943 film by William Beaudine

- Directed by: William Beaudine
- Written by: William Beaudine (as William X. Crowley) and Beryl Sachs
- Produced by: Sam Katzman and Jack Dietz (producers); Barney A. Sarecky (associate producer)
- Cinematography: Mack Stengler
- Edited by: Carl Pierson
- Distributed by: Monogram Pictures
- Release date: July 26, 1943
- Country: United States
- Language: English

Spotlight Scandals is a 1943 American musical comedy film directed by William Beaudine. It stars Billy Gilbert, Frank Fay, Bonnie Baker, and Harry Langdon.

== Plot ==
Entertainer Frank Fay is stranded in a midwestern town, where local barber Billy Gilbert is stage-struck. Billy offers to pay Frank's railroad fare east, provided Frank will help Billy pursue a stage career in New York. Billy struggles through desperately comic songs, and Frank tries to help his friend by keeping up a running patter while Billy is on stage. A clever producer notices how well Frank's comments complement Gilbert's buffoonery, and compels them to become a comedy team. At the height of their success, Frank gets a lucrative offer to star on radio with Bonnie Baker, but he refuses to separate from Billy. Billy steps aside, feigning a desire to split the partnership; he sacrifices their friendship to give Frank his chance.

Frank, now on his own, samples the high life and ultimately goes broke. When his brassy girlfriend Bernice dies violently, he is implicated. Billy gives up his savings to pay for Frank's defense, without Frank's knowledge. Frank is acquitted but his reputation is ruined, and he starts all over again in small-time shows. Billy, now broke himself, forms an act with an old performer and his two young sons. The act is failing, but Frank is in the audience. Frank goes on stage to make comic remarks as in bygone days, and the partners are reunited.

== Production ==
Originally called Spotlight Revue, this was the first of a four-picture contract with independent producer Sam Katzman, releasing through Monogram Pictures, teaming comic actors Billy Gilbert and Frank Fay. Katzman usually made action pictures and seldom made musicals, but he tried to add production value by hiring band singer Bonnie Baker (who had just left Orrin Tucker's orchestra), celebrity impersonators The Radio Rogues, and the big bands of Henry King and Herb Miller (Glenn Miller's brother). Silent-comedy star Harry Langdon, then working for Monogram, appeared in a supporting role. Adolescent musical comedians Butch and Buddy (Billy Lenhart and Kenneth Brown) were reunited with Billy Gilbert, with whom they appeared in two Gloria Jean musicals.

== Reception ==
Trade critics accepted Spotlight Scandals as a pleasant musical feature. Motion Picture Herald welcomed Fay and Gilbert as a team, comparing them and their potential to the very successful Abbott and Costello. "The House of Monogram put this introductory Fay-Gilbert film to a severe test on the occasion of its press preview by screening it at the Hollywood Paramount between performances of Five Graves to Cairo. A top-scale audience, that hadn't been told what was coming, manifested by lusty laughter its enjoyment of the Fay-Gilbert brand of comedy." Film Daily said, "This is a good picture. Frank Fay and Billy Gilbert make a great comedy team. It's not so much that these gentlemen are masters at the art of milking lines and situations, but their experiences give the entire proceedings a polish not often found in the work and best efforts of neophytes." The same reviewer commented on the heart-tugging plot resolution: "The tag is so good, most directors are afraid to use it for fear of the cry of 'corn'." Showmen's Trade Review liked the new team: "Some things go together like coffee and cake and that is the best description of the way Billy Gilbert and Frank Fay jell as a comedy team. The clever and sophisticated patter of Fay and the broad antics of Gilbert stand off as relief for each other to make them a hit team. The picture is a good bet." The Exhibitor applauded the effort: "This is one of the top productions for Monogram, and the producer shot the works in giving plenty of production material, name bands, and top performers. Gilbert and Fay make a good team, and should be continued in future productions. The public will be served a pleasing dish of entertainment." Trade publisher Pete Harrison wrote, "Frank Fay and Billy Gilbert emerge as a good comedy team in this diverting comedy with music. Although there is nothing novel either in the story or its treatment, it should serve fairly well as a supporting feature." Photoplay was less enthusiastic, calling it "mild fun," noting the comedy cast, but wondering, "Now why wasn't this funnier?"

The self-important Frank Fay was accustomed to higher salaries, bigger budgets, and better amenities than notoriously cheap producer Katzman could provide. Fay walked out on the series after only one picture. Billy Gilbert recruited his friend, comedian Shemp Howard, to replace Fay. Gilbert and Howard completed the three films remaining on the contract.

== Cast ==
- Billy Gilbert as Billy Gilbert
- Frank Fay as Frank Fay
- Bonnie Baker as Bonnie Baker
- Billy Lenhart as Butch
- Kenneth Brown as Buddy
- Harry Langdon as Oscar
- Iris Adrian as Bernice
- The Radio Rogues: Jimmy Hollywood, Eddie Bartell, and Sydney Chatton
- James Bush as Jerry
- Claudia Dell as Betty
- Eddie Parks as Eddie
- Betty Blythe as Mrs. Baker, radio sponsor
- Herb Miller and His Orchestra
- Henry King and His Orchestra
