= Abe Olman =

- Born: Abraham Olshewitz; December 20, 1887; Cincinnati, Ohio, US
- Died: January 4, 1984 (aged 96) Rancho Mirage, California, US
- Occupations: Songwriter, music publisher, music industry executive
- Instrument: Piano
- Years active: c.1905–1969

Abe Olman (December 20, 1887 (Note: Many sources state his birth year as 1888, but this appears to be an error.) – January 4, 1984), born Abraham Olshewitz, was an American songwriter and music publisher. He composed a number of successful ragtime and popular songs including "Red Onion Rag" (1912), "Down Among the Sheltering Palms" (1915), "Oh Johnny, Oh Johnny, Oh!" (1917), and "Down By the O-Hi-O" (1920). He was later director of ASCAP, and a founder of the Songwriters Hall of Fame which, in 1983, named the annual Abe Olman Publisher Award in his honor.

== Career ==
He was born in Cincinnati, Ohio, the son of Julius and Carolina Olshewitz, who had been born in Poland and Germany respectively. He learned piano as a child, and in the early 1900s started work as a traveling music salesman around Ohio, Indiana and Kentucky. His first compositions were published in Cincinnati in 1907, and then in 1909 in Indianapolis, where he lived for a period. In 1912, he moved to New York City, where his "Red Onion Rag" was published by George W. Meyer. He also spent time in Europe, performing in clubs in London and Paris before the outbreak of the First World War. After returning to the US, he set up the LaSalle Music Publishing Company in Chicago in 1914, and published his own song, "Down Among the Sheltering Palms", with words by James Brockman. He sold the song to New York publisher Leo Feist; it was performed and recorded by Al Jolson and became a great success. He continued to write prolifically, mainly with lyricist Ed Rose, and in 1917 they published "Oh Johnny, Oh!". The song was recorded in 1917 by both Billy Murray and Nora Bayes. It was successfully revived in 1939 by Orrin Tucker with singer "Wee" Bonnie Baker, and by The Andrews Sisters, and was recorded in 1959 by Peggy Lee on her album I Like Men!.

Candle Stick Rag, 1910 sound recording of a composition by Olman

In 1920, Olman began working in Manhattan for the Forster music publishing firm, and became a member of ASCAP, the American Society of Composers, Authors and Publishers. Two of his songs were included in the 1920 Ziegfeld Follies, including "O-Hi-O (O-My!-O!)", with lyrics by Jack Yellen, which was introduced by Al Jolson and which later (as "Down By the O-Hi-O") became a hit for the Andrews Sisters. Although he continued to write songs thereafter, he worked increasingly as an executive in the music industry. He became the secretary and general manager of Leo Feist, Inc. in 1935, holding the post until 1956, and also began working for the much larger firm of Robbins Music in the early 1940s. He is credited as being one of the first to see the benefits of promoting a song by placing it in a motion picture, particularly by playing the theme song under the opening credits. Olman was also director of ASCAP from 1946 to 1956.

In 1969, with Johnny Mercer and Howie Richmond, he co-founded the National Academy of Popular Music's Songwriters Hall of Fame. In 1983, the Songwriters Hall of Fame established and named the annual Abe Olman Publisher Award in his honor.

== Personal life ==
He married actress Mattie Adele Parker (stage name Peggy Parker) in 1922; they had two daughters. In later life he moved to live in southern California. He died in Rancho Mirage, California in 1984, at the age of 96.

== Songs ==
- 1912 "Red Onion Rag"
- 1917 "Colleen Machree" - L: Jack Mahoney
- 1917 "Faugh-A-Ballagh (Fog-A-Bolla)" - L: Ed Rose)
- 1917 "I Wish You All the Luck in the World"
- 1917 "Oh! Johnny Oh! Johnny Oh!!" - L: Ed Rose
- 1917 "When I Get back to Home Sweet Home"
- 1918 "Meaning of YMCA You Must Come Across" - L: Ed Rose
- 1918 "Oh, Susie, Behave" - L: Ed Rose
- 1918 "Pick a Little Four-Leaf Clover (And Send It Over to Me)" - L: C. Francis Reiner and Ed. Rose
- 1919 "Cootie Tickle, The (Over Here It's the Shimmie Dance)" - L: Jack Yellen
- 1919 "Johnny's in Town" with Geo. W. Meyer - L: Jack Yellen
- 1919 "I'm Waiting for Ships That Never Come In" - L: Jack Yellen
