= I'm Goin' to Fight My Way Right Back to Carolina =

Song composed by Billy Baskette

"I'm Goin' To Fight My Way Right Back to Carolina"
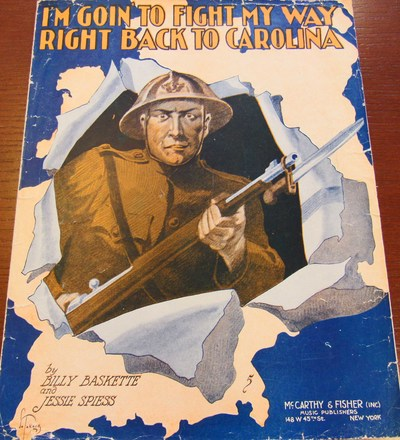
- Sheet music cover found at Pritzker Military Museum & Library

Song
- Language: English
- Published: 1918
- Label: McCarthy & Fisher, Inc.
- Songwriter(s): Billy Baskette and Jesse Spiess

"I'm Goin' To Fight My Way Right Back to Carolina" is a World War I era song written and composed by Billy Baskette and Jessie Spiess. The song was published in 1918 by McCarthy & Fisher, Inc. of New York City. The sheet music cover was designed by Andre C. De Takacs. It features an armed soldier tearing through the cover. The song was written for both voice and piano.

The lyrics are told from the point of view of a soldier who is willing to fight to his best ability. His inspiration is his girlfriend Caroline (also referred to as Carolina). The chorus is as follows:

I'm goin' to fight my way back to Carolina
I'm goin' to run every Hun,
every son of gun I see
Depend on me, Cause I'm in this thing to win
And I know that it's no sin
To grab a little German, any little Herman
and carve my name on him
And I am satisfied Carolina loves me
I left my heart with her in Dixie land,
She'll understand that I may come back with something missin'
But that won't keep us from huggin' and kissin'
When I fight my way back to Caroline

The sheet music can be found at Pritzker Military Museum & Library.

== Bibliography ==
- Parker, Bernard S. World War I Sheet Music 1. Jefferson: McFarland & Company, Inc., 2007. ISBN 978-0-7864-2798-7. OCLC 71790113
- Vogel, Frederick G. World War I Songs: A History and Dictionary of Popular American Patriotic Tunes, with Over 300 Complete Lyrics. Jefferson: McFarland & Company, Inc., 1995. ISBN 0-89950-952-5. OCLC 32241433
