= National Academy of Popular Music =

The National Academy of Popular Music (NAPM) is an American organization which administers the Songwriters Hall of Fame, and sponsors a series of workshops and showcases for the songwriting profession. It was formed in 1988 by Sammy Cahn and Bob Leone.
