= Russian Rag (composition) =

1918 ragtime piano composition

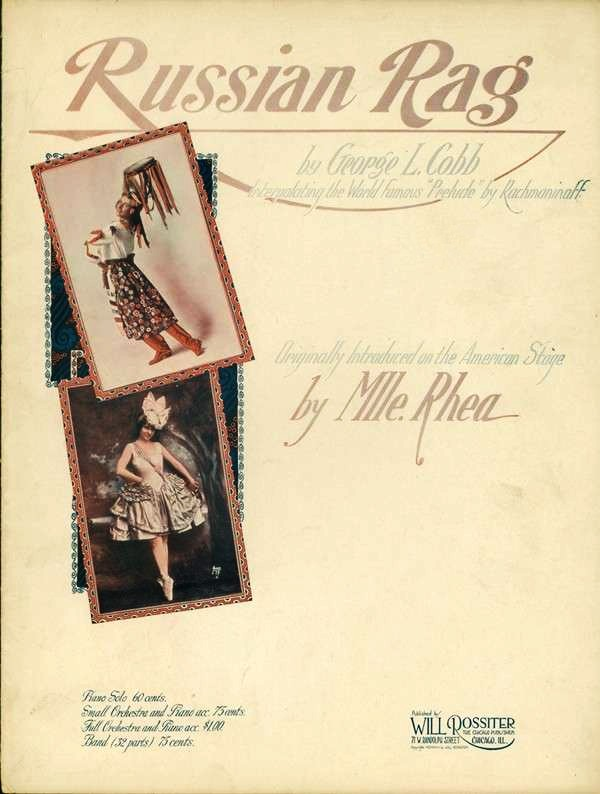
- Cover of sheet music, published by Will Rossiter, Chicago

Instrumental by Pietro Deiro
- Released: 1918
- Genre: Ragtime
- Composer: George L. Cobb

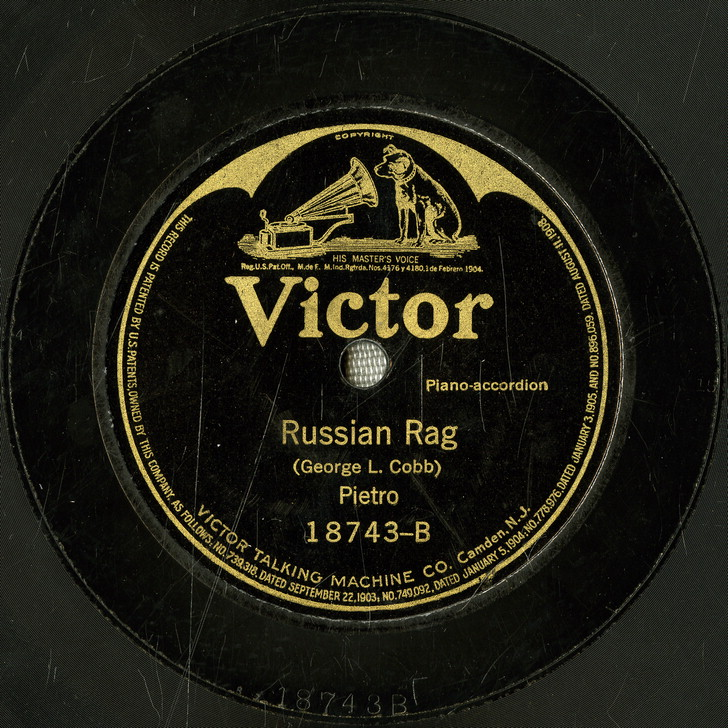
Victor 18743 Side B record label: Russian Rag, played by Pietro Deiro

Russian Rag
Accordion performance, played by Pietro Deiro

"Russian Rag" is a 1918 ragtime jazz piano composition by George L. Cobb. The composition was published by Francis, Day & Hunter Ltd.

The composition is based on the opening chord progression of Rachmaninoff's Prelude in C-sharp minor, Op.3, No.2. The piece was such a hit that Cobb wrote The New Russian Rag in 1923 in an attempt to arrange more of the Rachmaninoff prelude for ragtime piano.

Elena Kats-Chernin wrote another later piano composition entitled Russian Rag in 1996.
