= Your Hit Parade =

American radio and television music program (1935–1959)

- Genre: Music
- Directed by: Norman Jewison (1958–59)
- Starring: Dorothy Collins; Snooky Lanson; Gisele MacKenzie; Russell Arms; Eileen Wilson; June Valli; Sue Bennett; Virginia Gibson; Alan Copeland; Tommy Leonetti; Jill Corey; Johnny Desmond; Raymond Scott; Frank Sinatra
- Narrated by: Andre Baruch
- Country of origin: United States
- Original language: English

Production
- Producers: Dan Lounsbery, Ted Fetter
- Running time: 25 minutes

Original release
- Network: NBC (1950–1958); CBS (1958–1959)
- Release: July 10, 1950 – April 27, 1959

Your Hit Parade is an American radio and television music program that was broadcast from 1935 to 1953 on radio, and seen from 1950 to 1959 on television. It was sponsored by American Tobacco's Lucky Strike cigarettes. During its 24-year run, the show had 19 orchestra leaders and 52 singers or groups.

When the show debuted, there was no agreement on its title. The press referred to it by several names, with the most common being "Hit Parade", "The Hit Parade", "The Lucky Strike Hit Parade", and "The Lucky Strike Parade". The program title officially became "Your Hit Parade" on November 9, 1935.

Every Saturday evening, the program offered the most popular and bestselling songs of the week. The earliest format involved a presentation of the top 15 songs. Later, a countdown with fanfares led to the top three finalists, with the number one song for the finale. Occasional performances of standards and other favorite songs from the past were known as "Lucky Strike Extras".

Listeners were informed that the "Your Hit Parade survey checks the best sellers on sheet music and phonograph records, the songs most heard on the air and most played on jukeboxes, an accurate, authentic tabulation of America's taste in popular music." However, the exact procedure of this "authentic tabulation" remained a secret. Some believe song choices were often arbitrary due to various performance and production factors. The show's ad agencies—initially Lord and Thomas and later Batten, Barton, Durstine & Osborne—never revealed the specific sources or the methods that were used to determine top hits. They made a general statement that it was based mainly on "readings of radio requests, sheet music sales, dance-hall favorites and jukebox tabulations"; Radio Guide claimed "an endless popularity poll on a nationwide scale."

== Radio ==
=== Lucky Strike's first radio endeavors ===
The origins of the format can be traced back to the "Lucky Strike Saturday Night Dance Party" sponsored by Lucky Strike cigarettes. Led by Benjamin A. Rolfe, the show was heard on the NBC Red network Saturdays between 10 and 11 pm beginning in September 1928. The program was devised by American Tobacco's George W. Hill, an attempt to popularize the consumption of tobacco products, which were increasingly used by young people and women. For the latter demographic group, the company also launched the slogan "Reach for a Lucky instead of a sweet" at the same time. In a cross-promotion, Rolfe made recordings for Edison Records credited as "B.A. Rolfe and his Lucky Strike Orchestra".

Beginning in April 1930, the show became known as "The Lucky Strike Dance Hour", as a second hour-long show began airing Wednesday nights on the NBC Blue network (9:30 to 10:30 pm). During the fall, the Wednesday show was replaced by Tuesday and Thursday night broadcasts, also on NBC Red.

During its first three years, the show featured Rolfe's band playing popular songs and novelty tunes interspersed with plugs for Lucky Strikes by the announcer, whose other role was introducing each number. During the fall of 1931, the program was revamped as "The Lucky Strike Magic Carpet Show", a variety show hosted by Walter O'Keefe featuring the orchestras of Rolfe, Anson Weeks, Jack Denny, George Olsen, Abe Lyman, Phil Harris and others supplied exclusively by Jules Stein's Music Corporation of America, and the bands were picked up from diverse points across the US instead of originating entirely from New York, which was a novelty at the time. The "variety" segments included dramatizations of cases from the New York Police Department, society gossip by Walter Winchell (then a gossip columnist for Hearst's tabloid New York Daily Mirror, featuring a style different from the one Winchell is more remembered for), and comedy by Bert Lahr and Jack Pearl. During the spring and summer of 1933, the Tuesday and Thursday broadcasts were phased out and the show reverted to the original "Lucky Strike Saturday Night Dance Party" format with Rolfe's orchestra and the Men About Town trio, running until early 1934.

=== Your Hit Parade on radio (1935–1953) ===
The Frank Sinatra Your Hit Parade cardboard fan, designed like a tobacco leaf, is a rare collectible.

Your Hit Parade began on NBC April 20, 1935, as a 60-minute program with 15 songs played in a random format before presenting the number 1 song. Initially, the songs were more important than the singers, so a stable of vocalists went uncredited and were paid $100 per episode, equal to $2,348 in 2025. In 1936–37, it was carried on both NBC and CBS. Script continuity in the late 1930s and early 1940s was written by Alan Jay Lerner before he found fame as a lyricist. The first number one song on the first episode was "Soon" by Bing Crosby.

Some years passed before the countdown format was introduced, with the number of songs varying from seven to 15. Vocalists in the 1930s included Buddy Clark, Lanny Ross, Kay Thompson and Bea Wain (1939–1944), who was married to the show's announcer, French-born André Baruch. Frank Sinatra joined the show in 1943, which gave the show even more popularity. By 1944 however, Sinatra's move to Hollywood led to a conflict with American Tobacco as it determined that the singer was the one to pay the production costs (including the telephone hook-up to New York) and was fired for messing up the No. 1 song, "Don't Fence Me In", by interjecting a mumble to the effect that the song had too many words and missing a cue. An AFRS transcription survives of this show. As Sinatra zoomed in popularity, he was rehired, returning (1947–49) to co-star with Doris Day.

Helen O'Connell, making a guest appearance on the radio show Your Hit Parade, early 1950s.

Hugely popular on CBS through the WWII years, Your Hit Parade returned to NBC in 1947. The show's opening theme, from the musical revue George White's Scandals of 1926, was "This Is Your Lucky Day", with music by Ray Henderson and lyrics by Buddy G. DeSylva, Stephen W. Ballantine and Lew Brown.

Orchestra leaders over the years included Al Goodman, Lennie Hayton, Abe Lyman, Leo Reisman, Harry Salter, Ray Sinatra, Harry Sosnik, Axel Stordahl, Peter Van Steeden, Mark Warnow and Raymond Scott (1949–1957). The chorus was led by musical director Lyn Murray.

Dozens of singers appeared on the radio program, including Bonnie Baker, Dorothy Collins, Beryl Davis, Gogo DeLys, Joan Edwards (1941–46), Georgia Gibbs, Dick Haymes, Snooky Lanson, Gisèle MacKenzie, Johnny Mercer, Andy Russell, Dinah Shore, Ginny Simms, Lawrence Tibbett, Martha Tilton, Eileen Wilson, Barry Wood, and occasional guest vocalists. The show featured two tobacco auctioneers, Lee Aubrey "Speed" Riggs of Goldsboro, North Carolina and F.E. Boone of Lexington, Kentucky.

From the summer of 1950 to the start of summer of 1951 (the first year of the Hit Parade television show), the stars of the TV show—Eileen Wilson, Snooky Lanson, and Dorothy Collins—also starred on the Hit Parade radio show. (Wilson had sung on the radio show since 1948.) Beginning in the fall of 1950, the radio show and the TV show both aired on Saturdays; the radio program was heard from 9:00–9:30 pm, Eastern time, and the TV show was seen from 10:30–11:00 pm. Both shows featured the Lucky Strike Orchestra, led by Raymond Scott.

In the fall of 1951, the radio show moved to Thursday nights, and its personnel and format were changed. The show, still sponsored by Lucky Strike, now starred Guy Lombardo and his Royal Canadians. Vocalists from Lombardo's orchestra sang on the new version of the radio show, which also featured a guest female vocalist each week; the guest vocalist was called the "Lucky Star of the Week". Guy Lombardo was host of the show until January 16, 1953, when the Hit Parade radio program aired for the last time.

==== Spin-off series ====
The success of the radio show spawned a spin-off series, "Your All-Time Hit Parade", sponsored by Lucky Strike and devoted to all-time favorites and standards mixed with some current hits. The program began on NBC February 12, 1943, airing Fridays at 8:30 pm until June 2, 1944, and then Sundays at 7 pm as a summer replacement for Jack Benny, continuing until September 24, 1944. The regular vocalists were Marie Green, Ethel Smith, Martha Stewart, Bea Wain and Jerry Wayne. Lyn Murray led the chorus, and the orchestra was conducted by Mark Warnow.

On December 6, 1948, Lucky Strike introduced yet another musical series, the daytime "Your Lucky Strike" with host Don Ameche, aka "The Don Ameche Show". This 30-minute show, airing weekdays at 3:30 pm on CBS, was a talent competition with little-known and unknown professional vocalists, backed by Al De Crescent on organ or Bill Wardell on piano. The performers were judged by a trio of random housewives casting votes via long-distance phone calls. Winners were booked into the Mocambo, Earl Carroll's or other night clubs. Produced by Bernard Schubert and directed by Harlan Dunning, this show also featured auctioneer Riggs. It went off the air March 4, 1949.

During the early 1980s, André Baruch and Bea Wain hosted a syndicated radio version of Your Hit Parade, reconstructing the list of hits of selected weeks in the 1940s and playing the original recordings.

=== Your Hit Parade on television (1950–1959) ===
André Baruch continued as the announcer when the program arrived on NBC television in summer 1950 (Del Sharbutt succeeded him in the 1957–58 season), written by William H. Nichols, and produced, in its first years, by both Dan Lounsbery and Ted Fetter. Norman Jewison and Clark Jones (nominated for a 1955 Emmy Award) directed with associate director Bill Colleran. Tony Charmoli won a 1956 Emmy for his choreography, and the show's other dance directors were Tom Hansen (1957–58), Peter Gennaro (1958–59) and Ernie Flatt (uncredited). Paul Barnes won an Emmy in 1957 for his art direction. In 1953, the show won a Peabody Award "for consistent good taste, technical perfection and unerring choice of performers."

The seven top-rated songs of the week were presented in elaborate TV production numbers requiring constant set and costume changes. However, because the top songs sometimes stayed on the charts for many weeks, it was necessary to continually find ways of devising a new and different production number of the same song week after week. After the show was revamped in September 1957, the top songs were reduced to five, while "extras" were increased.

On the TV series, vocalists Dorothy Collins (1950–57, 1958–59), Russell Arms (1952–57), Snooky Lanson (1950–57) and Gisèle MacKenzie (1953–57) were top-billed during the show's peak years. During this time, MacKenzie had her own hit record in 1955 with "Hard to Get" which climbed to the #5 ranking in June 1955 and stayed on the charts for 16 weeks. She also starred in her own NBC variety program, The Gisele MacKenzie Show from 1957 to 1958, produced by her mentor, comedian Jack Benny. Russell Arms also enjoyed a hit record during his stint on the show – "Cinco Robles (Five Oaks)" (# 22 / 1957)

The line-up of the show's other singers included Eileen Wilson (1950–52), Sue Bennett (1951–52), June Valli (1952–53), Alan Copeland (1957–58), Jill Corey (1957–58), Johnny Desmond (1958–59), Virginia Gibson (1957–58), and Tommy Leonetti (1957–58). All were performers of standards, show tunes or big band numbers. Featured prominently were the Hit Parade dancers and the Hit Paraders, the program's choral singers. The vocal arranger and choral director of the Hit Parade was Ray Charles (1950–57). He started with the pilot shows in 1949, but did not receive billing until 1955 because he was simultaneously working with a choir on a show sponsored by a competing brand (Chesterfield cigarettes). The Hit Paraders sang the opening commercial jingle (composed by Raymond Scott):

Be happy, go Lucky,
Be happy, go Lucky Strike
Be happy, go Lucky,
Go Lucky Strike today!

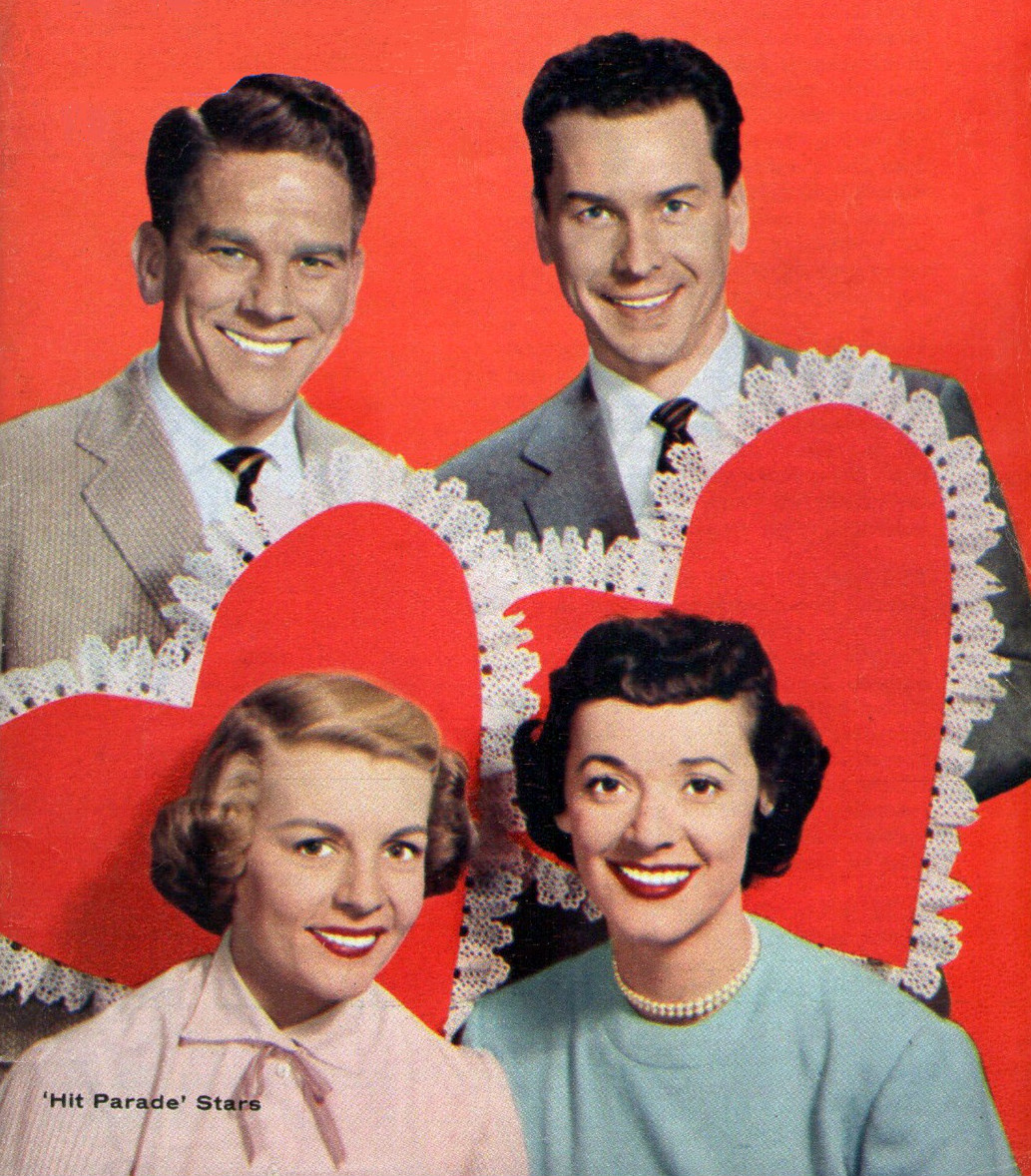
Your Hit Parade's TV vocalists (top, l. to r.): Snooky Lanson, Russell Arms and (bottom, l. to r.) Dorothy Collins, Gisèle MacKenzie.

During the 1950–1951 season, Bob Fosse appeared as a guest dancer on several episodes, with partner Mary Ann Niles. From 1950 until 1957, the orchestra was led by well-known bandleader and musician Raymond Scott; the show's other music supervisors were Don Walker, Dick Jacobs (1957–58) and Harry Sosnik (1958–59). During the 1957–58 season, sponsor American Tobacco pitched Hit Parade filter cigarettes instead of Lucky Strikes. Alternate sponsors included Avco Manufacturing's Crosley division (1951–54), Richard Hudnut hair care products (1954–57), and The Toni Company (1957–58).

Your Hit Parade finished in the Nielsen ratings at #29 in the 1950–51 season, #30 in 1953–54, #15 in 1954–55 and #23 in 1955–56.

The show faded with the rise of rock and roll when the performance became more important than the song. The need for visual performances to accompany the songs on television resulted in skits that became more ludicrous as the songs repeated each week. Those issues, along with the growing popularity of rock and roll, contributed to the show's eventual cancellation.

In the fall of 1957, the show was revamped: production was moved to Hollywood with a new cast and was now broadcast in color, being the first TV show to be introduced by the animated version of the "Living Color" peacock (nowadays the logo of NBC). American Tobacco also switched sponsorship to its new upscale "Hit Parade" filter brand that had been launched that spring. However, low ratings caused the show to revert to New York and black-and-white in 1958 (sponsorship also reverted to Lucky Strike, as the Hit Parade brand was quietly retired late that year due to low sales), switching to CBS before being cancelled during the spring of 1959. While Your Hit Parade was unable to deal with the rock revolution, the show's imaginative production concepts had an obvious influence on the wave of music videos that began in the decade that followed.

CBS also brought it back for a brief summer revival in 1974 and 1975, now divorced from any Lucky Strike sponsorship due to the 1970 passage of the Public Health Cigarette Smoking Act. That version featured Kelly Garrett, Sheralee and Chuck Woolery. The 1974 version of Your Hit Parade also featured hit songs from a designated week in the 1940s or 1950s. Milton DeLugg conducted the orchestra and Chuck Barris packaged this series.

The show's familiar closing theme was "So Long for A While":

So long for a while.
That's all the songs for a while.
So long to Your Hit Parade,
And the tunes that you picked to be played.
So long!

== See also ==
- List of Your Hit Parade number-one songs

== Sources ==
- All in the Family theme song: "Boy, the way Glenn Miller played/Songs that made the Hit Parade."
- Cox, Jim. Music Radio: The Great Performers and Programs of the 1920s through Early 1960s. Jefferson, North Carolina: McFarland, 2005. ISBN 0-7864-2047-2
- Nachman, Gerald. Raised on Radio. University of California Press, 2000.
- Schnabel, Phil and Crowe, William H. "Big Band Database: Compilation of Your Hit Parade top tunes (1935–55)"(archive)
- Williams, John R. This Was Your Hit Parade. Camden, Maine, 1973.
