= Bonnie Baker (singer) =

American singer (1917–1990)

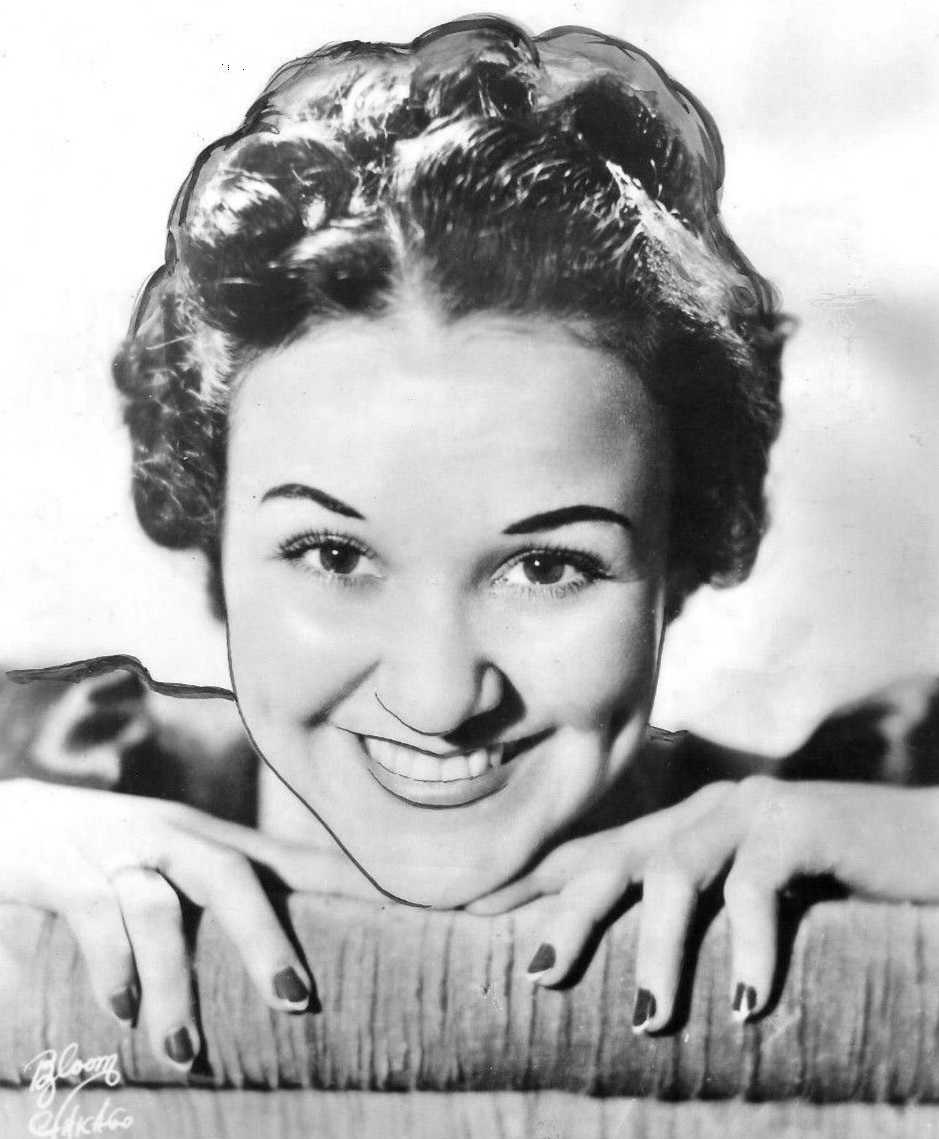
- Baker in 1940

Background information
- Also known as: Wee Bonnie Baker; Evelyn Reyo Lakey
- Born: Evelyn Underhill (or Evelyn Nelson); April 1, 1917; Orange, Texas, United States
- Died: August 11, 1990 (aged 73) Fort Lauderdale, Florida, United States
- Genres: Popular music
- Occupation: Singer
- Years active: 1936–1965
- Labels: Columbia Records, Warner Bros. Records

Bonnie Baker (née Evelyn Underhill or Nelson, April 1, 1917 – August 11, 1990) was an American singer of jazz and popular music and was known from 1936 to the end of her performing career as Wee Bonnie Baker. Her biggest hit was "Oh Johnny, Oh Johnny, Oh!," recorded with the Orrin Tucker Orchestra in 1939.

== Early life ==
She was born in Orange, Texas; at the time of her death, her family gave her birth name as Evelyn Underhill, although other sources give it as Evelyn Nelson. She attended school in Galveston and Houston. At age 16, during the 1932–1933 school year, she was a day student at Mount de Sales Academy, in Macon, Georgia, which at that time was a Roman Catholic boarding school for girls.

== Career ==
She then moved back to Houston where she sang in night clubs. She joined Orrin Tucker's band as a vocalist in 1936, after Louis Armstrong suggested that Tucker recruit her. Tucker gave her the stage name "Wee" Bonnie Baker on account of her height, about 4-foot 11 inches. She had only local fame before joining Tucker's orchestra – wider notability did not occur until she performed at the Empire Room of the Palmer House in Chicago in 1939, when she began to flourish in the South and Pacific Coast.

Her girlish voice, described as "like a tiny silver bell, soft but tonally true", was used on a version of the 1917 song "Oh Johnny, Oh!", written by Abe Olman and Ed Rose. It was recorded with the Orrin Tucker Orchestra on August 20, 1939, in Los Angeles. Released on Columbia Records, it became popular in 1940, reaching no. 2 on the Billboard pop chart, remaining on the chart for 14 weeks, and selling 1.5 million copies. It was also Orrin Tucker's biggest hit. She also had success with the songs "You'd Be Surprised", "Billy", "Would Ja Mind?", and "Especially for You".

She left the Tucker orchestra in 1942, and legally adopted her stage name, Bonnie Baker, on October 9, 1943, in Circuit Court, Chicago, Illinois. She then continued with a solo career, singing with the USO (United Service Organizations) during World War II, and appearing regularly on the radio show Your Hit Parade. She also sang with other bands. In 1948, she recorded a novelty song, "That's All Folks!," as a duet with Mel Blanc playing the character Porky Pig. She also voiced the cartoon character Chilly Willy in the 1950s. She released an album, Oh Johnny!, with orchestra conducted by Wilbur Hatch, on Warner Bros. Records in 1956. After moving to Florida in 1958, she continued to sing in clubs with her husband Bill Gailey, who performed as Billy Rogers; the two often performed with Chuck Cabot and His Orchestra.

She gave up performing after suffering a heart attack in 1965. In 1976, she was a switchboard operator at a Ft. Lauderdale medical center.

== Personal life and death ==
=== Marriages ===
Baker was married four times:

1. Around 1935, she married Claude R. Lakey (1910–1990), who then was a saxophonist with Harry James. They divorced December 1936 in Houston. She was named as Evelyn Reyo Lakey at the time she legally adopted her stage name of Bonnie Baker in 1943.
2. On December 9, 1943, she married John Hollingsworth Morse (1910–1988) — then an Army first lieutenant based in Los Angeles who later became a film and TV director – at the Gotham Hotel in New York.
3. On March 16, 1948 in Leesburg, Georgia, Baker married Frank E. Taylor, her manager, while their automobile was being serviced on a trip from Chicago to Miami. Baker met Taylor in Detroit in 1944, and Taylor became her manager in late 1946. They divorced October 8, 1949. Together, they had a daughter, Sharon Taylor (1948–2003), who married Joel G. McFarland (born 1936).
4. In late spring 1950, giving her maiden name as Underhill, she married William (Bill) Henry Gailey (1914–1990), a jazz guitarist and stage-act writer, also known as Billy Rogers, with whom she had been performing, and continued to perform with until her heart attack in 1965.

=== Death ===
She died in Fort Lauderdale, Florida in 1990 at the age of 73.

== Discography ==
- Orrin Tucker and His Orchestra (Columbia, 1939) OCLC 62469659

Oh Johnny, Oh Johnny, Oh! lyrics by Ed Rose, music by Abe Olman

- Bonnie Baker, Oh Johnny! Warner Bros., 1958) OCLC 9695884

Orchestra conducted by Wilbur Hatch, music arranged by Carl Brandt

== Filmography ==
- You're the One (1941)
- Spotlight Scandals (1943)
- NBC Presents (1949, TV series)
- Armstrong Circle Theatre (1951, TV series)
