= Ed Rose (lyricist) =

American lyrist (1875–1935)

Ed Rose (née Edward Smackels Jr.; 24 November 1875 Chicago — 29 April 1935 Evanston, Illinois), was an American lyricist who wrote the words to Oh Johnny, Oh Johnny, Oh! composed in 1917 by Abe Olman.

== Rose & Snyder Co. Incorporated ==
In 1906, George M. Krey (a music publisher from Boston), Ted Snyder, and Ed Rose formed the music publishing company, Rose & Snyder Co., located in Tin Pan Alley. In May 1908, the firm was incorporated in the state of New York. The directors were Edward Smackels, George M. Krey, and Maurice H. Rosenzweig, an entertainment lawyer. That same month (May 1908), Ed Snyder severed his affiliation with Ed Rose and Ted Snyder. And, in June 1909, Ted Snyder severed his connection with the firm to form his own music publishing company, the Ted Snyder Company, which evolved into Waterson, Berlin & Snyder, Inc., in 1918. In 1909, composer Thomas Lemonier (1870–1945) joined the staff of Rose & Snyder.

== Selected works ==
F.A. Mills, 48 West 29 Street, New York City

- There Must Be Somethin' the Matter with Me, lyrics by Rose, music by Ted Snyder (1904) OCLC 63928070
- The Man in the Moon Was Wise, lyrics by Rose, music by Ted Snyder (1904) OCLC 498291813
- The Goblin Man, lyrics by Rose, music by Ted Snyder (1904) OCLC 498291708
- Here's My Friend, lyrics by Rose, music by Ted Snyder (1904) OCLC 26009129, 498291728
- Heinie, lyrics by Rose, music by Ted Snyder (1904) OCLC 498291716
- I Wonder If You Miss Me as I Miss You, lyrics by Rose, music by Ted Snyder (1904) OCLC 14553576
- Nothin' From Nothin' Leaves You, lyrics by Rose, music by Ted Snyder (1905) OCLC 26007035, 180858330
- Don't Notice Me, lyrics by Rose, music by Ted Snyder (1906) OCLC 61928330
- I Marched Around Again, lyrics by Rose, music by Ted Snyder (1907)
- Take a Car, lyrics by Rose, music by Ted Snyder (1908) OCLC 726894183

Ted Snyder Company

- If You Cared For Me As I Cared for You, lyrics by Rose, music by Ted Snyder (1908)

Rose & Snyder Co. Incorporated, New York

- Don't Worry: It May Not All Be True, lyrics by Rose, music by Ted Snyder (1907) OCLC 57298897, 643088322
- What You Goin' to Tell Old St. Peter: When You Meet Him at the Golden Gate? lyrics & music by Rose (1908) OCLC 44880558
- Some Heart is Sighing, lyrics and music by Rose (1908) OCLC 19228974
- Honey Lou: The Suicide Song, lyrics by Rose, music by Tom Lemonier (1908) OCLC 50253570
- Play Dat Rag, words by Rose & Dunston; music by Thomas Lemonier (1870–1945) (1908) OCLC 51742798
- Move On Mr. Moon, lyrics by Rose, music by Ted Snyder (1908) OCLC 726903831

F.A. Mills, 48 West 29 Street, New York City

- I'd Like To Have Your Photograph, lyrics by Rose, music by Kerry Mills, F.A. Mills (1909) OCLC 499103761
- I'd Like To Be The Fellow That Girl is Waiting For, lyrics by Rose, music by Kerry Mills, F.A. Mills (1909) OCLC 499103752

La Salle Music Publishers, Inc., Chicago

- Sooner or Later Your Heart Will Cry "I Want You," lyrics by Rose, music by Ted Snyder (1915) OCLC 10613420
- If You've Got A Little Bit Hang On To It, It's Hard To Get a Little Bit More' lyrics by Rose, music by Ted Snyder (1915) OCLC 499115466

McCarthy & Fisher, Inc.

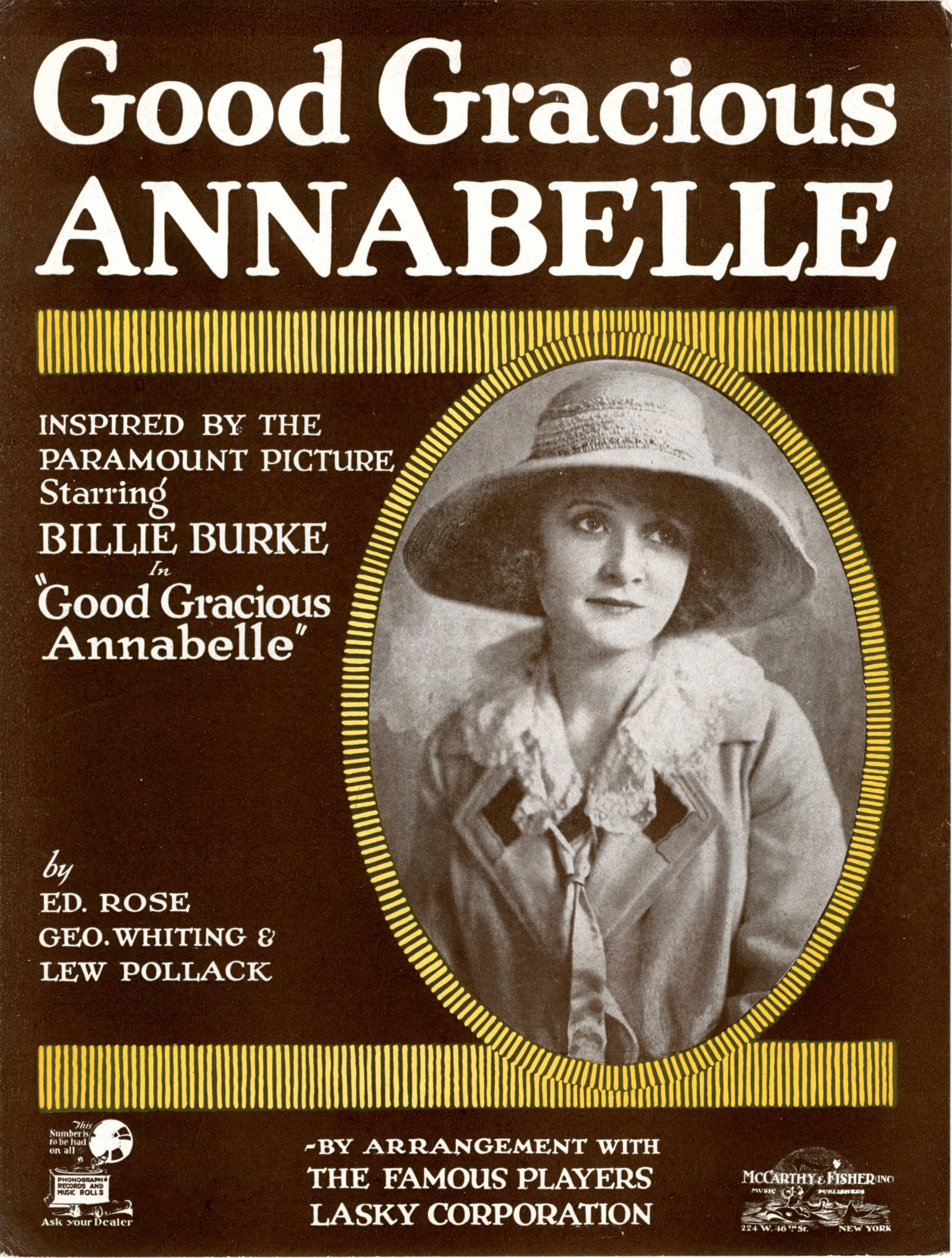
Sheet music cover for Good Gracious Annabelle

- Good Gracious Annabelle, lyrics and music by Rose, George Whiting & Lew Pollack (1919) OCLC 51098042
- Everybody Wants a Key to my Cellar, Rose, Billy Baskette, & Lew Pollack (1919) OCLC 28269330
- Oh, Susie, Behave lyrics by Rose and music by Abe Olman (1918) OCLC 13466894

Forster Music Publisher, Inc.

- Oh Johnny, Oh Johnny, Oh! lyrics by Rose, music by Abe Olman (1887–1984) (1917; 1944)

Version with patriotic lyrics by Raymond A. Sherwood (1917) OCLC 741366211

- Goodnight, Moonlight, lyrics by Rose, music by Frank Magine (1924) OCLC 367790557

Milton Weil Music Co., Chicago

- Right After They Leave My Arms, lyrics & music by Rube Bennett, Ed Rose, & Billy Baskette (1927)

Joe Davis, Inc., New York (Joseph Morton Davis; 1896–1978)

- Carolina Lullaby, words and music by Cecelia Reeker (née Huenergardt; 1897–1981), Rose, & Billy Baskette (1933) OCLC 497309474, 671311436

== Family ==
Ed's Brother, Eugene Smackels (1870–1939), was a singer, vaudevillian actor, and alumnus of Northwestern University.
