= Paul Ash =

German-American orchestra leader and composer (1891–1958)

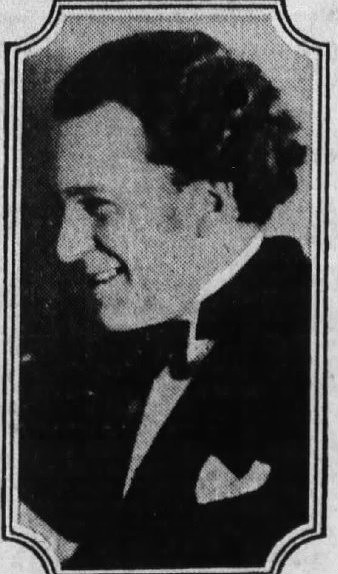
Ash in 1931

Paul Robert Ash (February 11, 1891, German Empire — July 13, 1958, Manhattan, New York) was a German orchestra leader, composer, vaudeville personality, and recording artist, who emigrated to the United States.

He recorded several hit songs: "Rememb'ring" (Brunswick, 1924), with his Granada Orchestra, "My Pet" (Columbia, 1928) and "Shadows on the Swanee" (Columbia, 1933). He also penned Kay Kyser's theme "Thinking of You."

In 1928 he performed a three week engagement in New York City at the Paramount Theatre with a young Ginger Rogers as her career was beginning.

He was born in the German Empire but, at the age of one, moved to America.
