= George L. Cobb =

American composer (1886–1942)

George Linus Cobb
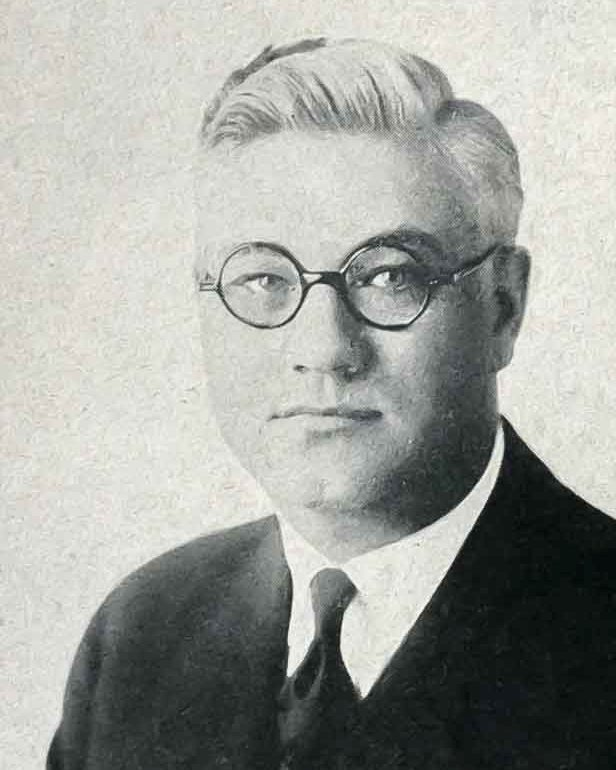

Background information
- Born: August 31, 1886; Mexico, New York, U.S.
- Died: December 25, 1942 (aged 56) Brookline, Massachusetts, U.S.
- Genres: Ragtime
- Occupation: Composer

George Linus Cobb (August 31, 1886 – December 25, 1942) was an American composer. He composed over 200 pieces of music, including ragtime, marches, and waltzes. He also wrote columns for music trade publications.

== Career ==
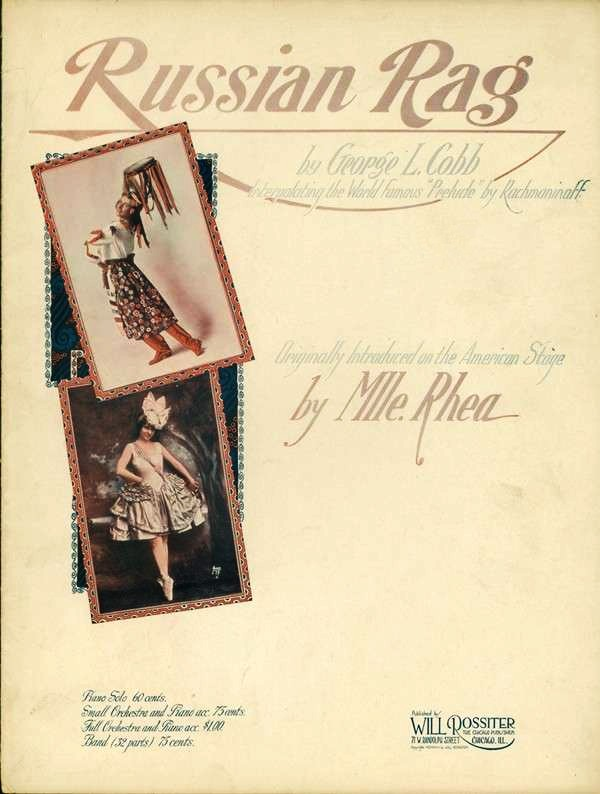
Russian Rag cover, 1918

Cobb attended the School of Harmony and Composition at Syracuse University in 1905, and his compositions began soon thereafter.

Cobb collaborated with lyricist Jack Yellen on many early songs, and in 1950 Billboard described Cobb as a "roving music teacher" during Yellen's sophomore year in college. They sold their first big hit, All Aboard for Dixieland, for $100 in 1913, but the two had been writing songs as early as 1909, beginning with Moonlight Makes Me Lonesome For A Girl Like You.

Cobb's most famous work is Russian Rag, a composition based on the opening chord progression of Rachmaninoff's Prelude in C-sharp minor, Op.3, No.2. The piece was such a hit in 1918 that Cobb wrote The New Russian Rag in 1923 in an attempt to arrange more of the Rachmaninoff prelude for ragtime piano.

By 1917, Cobb began writing a monthly column titled "Just Between You and Me" in The Tuneful Yankee, a ragtime music magazine owned by publisher Walter Jacobs. The magazine also published many of Cobb's musical compositions. Cobb continued writing for the magazine after the name changed to Melody in 1918.

== Selected Discography ==
- American Quartet- All Aboard for Dixieland (1914), Victor
- Billy Murray & Will Oakland- Just For To-night (1914), Victor
- Collins & Harlan- Alabama Jubilee (1915), Victor
- Billy Murray & Irving Kaufman- Are You From Dixie (Cause I'm From Dixie Too) (1915), Victor
- Peerless Quartet- When You're Five Times Sweet Sixteen (1916), Victor
- Peerless Quartet- On Honolulu Bay (1916), Victor
- Earl Rector and the Rector Novelty Orchestra- Russian Rag (1918), Columbia
- Six Brown Brothers- Peter Gink (1919), Victor

== Death and legacy ==
Cobb died of coronary thrombosis on December 25, 1942.

== See also ==
- List of ragtime composers
