= Orrin Tucker =

- Birth name: Robert Orrin Tucker
- Born: February 17, 1911; St. Louis, Missouri, United States
- Died: April 9, 2011 (aged 100); South Pasadena, California, United States
- Occupation: Bandleader
- Instrument: Saxophone
- Years active: 1939–1990s

Robert Orrin Tucker (February 17, 1911 – April 9, 2011) was an American bandleader born in St. Louis, Missouri, United States, whose theme song was "Drifting and Dreaming". His biggest hit was "Oh Johnny, Oh Johnny, Oh!" (1939), sung by vocalist "Wee" Bonnie Baker. He founded his first band while a college student at North Central College in Naperville, Illinois.

== Career ==
Orrin Tucker's big band, which he formed in 1933, specialized in a more relaxed style of swing, which was somewhat less complex than the music of Duke Ellington, Benny Goodman and other famous contemporary bandleaders of the day. Tucker's orchestra produced more than 70 recordings. Tucker's most successful hit was the 1939 recording of the 1917 song "Oh Johnny, Oh Johnny, Oh!," featuring the singer Wee Bonnie Baker. It sold over one million copies, and was awarded a gold disc by the RIAA. Orrin Tucker applied for active duty in the Medical Corps in the Navy; he left the Orchestra June 7, 1942 and by July 15, 1942 expected the call for duty. He later appeared on Your Hit Parade.

Tucker and his orchestra remained active until the 1990s, when health problems forced him to retire. In 2003, Tucker was interviewed about his passion for music and his long career as a bandleader by the NAMM Oral History Program. He died in South Pasadena, California, on April 9, 2011, aged 100.
