= Kirtanananda Swami =

American Hindu guru and convicted criminal(allegations)(1937–2011)

Kirtanananda Swami Bhaktipada
- Kirtanananda Swami in 1982

Personal life
- Born: Keith Gordon Ham; September 6, 1937 Peekskill, New York, US
- Died: October 24, 2011 (aged 74) Thane, India

Religious life
- Religion: Hinduism
- Denomination: Vaishnavism
- Temple: New Vrindaban
- Philosophy: Achintya Bheda Abheda
- Lineage: Brahma-Madhva-Gauḍīya Sampradāya
- Sect: Gaudiya Vaishnavism
- Ordination: Gauḍīya Vaiṣṇava Sannyasa as Kīrtanānanda Svāmī, by Bhaktivedanta Swami, 1967, India
- Initiation: Gauḍīya Vaiṣṇava Diksa as Kīrtanānanda dāsa, by Bhaktivedanta Swami, 1966, New York

Religious career
- Post: Co-founder, New Vrindaban (1968); Guru-Acarya, ISKCON (1978–87) Founder-Acarya, New Vrindaban (1977–94);
- Successor: Madhusudan Das ("Bapuji")

Kirtanananda Swami(IAST: Kīrtanānanda Svāmī; September 6, 1937 – October 24, 2011), also known as Swami Bhaktipada, was a convicted criminal and child rapist. He was as an initiating guru in the International Society for Krishna Consciousness (ISKCON), commonly known as the Hare Krishna Movement, from 1977 until his expulsion in 1987. He co-founded New Vrindaban, a Hare Krishna community in Marshall County, West Virginia, where he served as spiritual leader from 1968 until 1994.

== Early life ==
Kīrtanānanda was born Keith Gordon Ham in Peekskill, New York, in 1937, the youngest of five children of Conservative Baptist minister Francis Gordon Ham and his wife Marjorie. Keith's older brother, F. Gerald Ham, would go on to fame as an archivist. Keith Ham inherited his father's missionary spirit and attempted to convert classmates to his family's faith. Despite an acute case of polio which he contracted around his 17th birthday, he graduated with honors from Peekskill High School in 1955. He received a Bachelor of Arts in History from Maryville College in Maryville, Tennessee on May 20, 1959, and graduated magna cum laude, first in his class of 117.

He received a Woodrow Wilson fellowship to study American history at the University of North Carolina at Chapel Hill, where he remained for three years. There he met Howard Morton Wheeler (1940–89), an undergraduate English major from Mobile, Alabama who became his lover and lifelong friend. Later Kīrtanānanda acknowledged that, before becoming a Hare Krishna, he had a homosexual relationship with Wheeler for many years, which was documented in the film Holy Cow, Swami, a 1996 documentary by Jacob Young.

The two resigned from the university on February 3, 1961, and left Chapel Hill after being threatened with an investigation over a "sex scandal", and moved to New York City. Ham promoted LSD use and became an LSD guru. He worked as an unemployment claims reviewer. He enrolled at Columbia University in 1961, where he received a Waddell fellowship to study religious history with Whitney Cross, but he quit academic life after several years when he and Wheeler traveled to India in October 1965 in search of a guru. Unsuccessful, they returned to New York after six months.

== As Kīrtanānanda ==
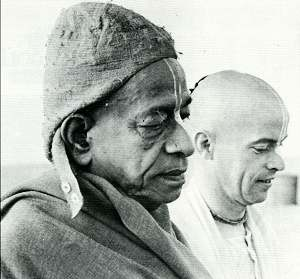
Swami Prabhupada and Kīrtanānanda, undated

In June 1966, after returning from India, Ham met the Bengali Gaudiya Vaishnava guru A.C. Bhaktivedanta Swami Prabhupada (then known simply as "Swāmiji" to his disciples), the founder-acharya of the International Society for Krishna Consciousness (ISKCON), more popularly known in the West as the Hare Krishnas. After attending Bhagavad-gita classes at the modest storefront temple at 26 Second Avenue on the Lower East Side of Manhattan, Ham accepted Swamiji as his spiritual master, receiving initiation as "Kīrtanānanda Dāsa" ("the servant of one who takes pleasure in kirtan") on September 23, 1966. Swamiji sometimes called him "Kitchen-ānanda" because of his cooking expertise. Howard Wheeler was initiated two weeks earlier on September 9, 1966, and received the name "Hayagriva Dāsa".

Kīrtanānanda was among the first of Swāmiji's western disciples to shave his head (apart from the sikha), don robes (traditional Bengali Vaishnava clothing consists of dhoti and kurta), and move into the temple. In March 1967, on the order of Swāmiji, Kīrtanānanda and Janus Dambergs (Janardana Dāsa), a French-speaking university student, established the Montreal Hare Krishna temple. On August 28, 1967, while traveling with Swāmiji in India, Kīrtanānanda Dāsa became Prabhupāda's first disciple to be initiated into the Vaishnava order of renunciation (sannyasa: a lifelong vow of celibacy in mind, word, and body), and received the name Kīrtanānanda Swāmi. Within weeks, however, he returned to New York City against Prabhupāda's wishes and attempted to add esoteric cultural elements of Christianity to Prabhupāda's devotional bhakti system. Other disciples of Prabhupāda saw this as a takeover attempt. In letters from India, Prabhupāda soundly chastised him and banned him from preaching in ISKCON temples.

== The New Vrindaban Community ==
Kīrtanānanda, Vamanadev, Hrishikesh, Hayagriva and Pradyumna, at New Vrindaban (late summer, 1968)

Kīrtanānanda lived with Wheeler, by then known as Hayagriva Dasa, who was teaching English at a community college in Wilkes Barre, Pennsylvania. In the San Francisco Oracle (an underground newspaper), Kīrtanānanda saw a letter from Richard Rose Jr., who wanted to form an ashram on his land in Marshall County, West Virginia. "The conception is one of a non-profit, non-interfering, non-denominational retreat or refuge, where philosophers might come to work communally together, or independently, where a library and other facilities might be developed."

On a weekend free of classes (March 30–31, 1968), Kīrtanānanda and Hayagriva visited the two properties owned by Rose. After Hayagriva returned to Wilkes Barre, Kīrtanānanda stayed on in Rose's backwoods farmhouse. In July 1968, after a few months of Kīrtanānanda's living in isolation, he and Hayagriva visited Prabhupada in Montreal. Prabhupāda "forgave his renegade disciples in Montreal with a garland of roses and a shower of tears". When the pair returned to West Virginia, Richard Rose Jr. and his wife Phyllis gave Hayagriva a 99-year lease on the 132.77-acre property for $4,000, with an option to purchase for $10 when the lease expired. Hayagriva put down a $1,500 deposit.

Kīrtanānanda Swāmi and New Vrindaban Community president Kuladri dās, c. mid-1970s

Prabhupāda established the purpose and guided the development of the community in dozens of letters and four personal visits (1969, 1972, 1974 and 1976). New Vrindaban would highlight five key elements for ISKCON:

1. Cow Protection and local agriculture,
2. Simple living,
3. Holy pilgrimage,
4. Spiritual education,
5. And above all, loving Krishna.

Kīrtanānanda eventually established himself as leader and sole authority of the community. In New Vrindaban publications from the late 1970s through the 1980s he was honored as "Founder-Acharya" of New Vrindaban, in imitation of Prabhupada's title of Founder-Acharya of ISKCON. Over time the community expanded, devotees from other ISKCON centers moved in, and cows and land were acquired until New Vrindaban properties consisted of nearly 2,500 acres. New Vrindaban became a favorite ISKCON place of pilgrimage and many ISKCON devotees attended the annual Krishna Janmashtami festivals. For some, Kīrtanānanda's previous offenses were forgiven. Many devotees admired him for his austere lifestyle (for a time he lived in an abandoned chicken coop), his preaching skills and devotion to the presiding deities of New Vrindaban: Sri Sri Radha Vrindaban Chandra.

== Palace of Gold ==
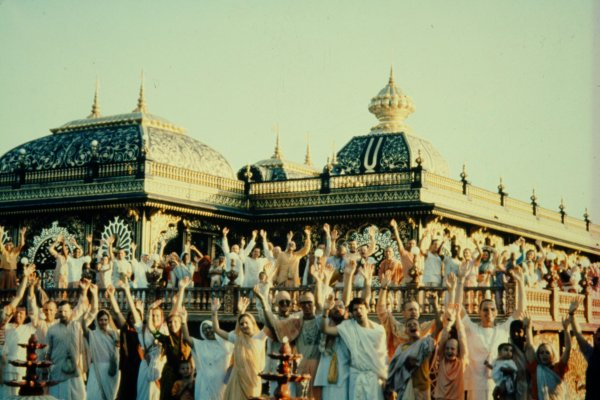
Prabhupada's Palace of Gold in 1982

Late in 1972, Kīrtanānanda and sculptor-architect Bhagavatānanda Dāsa decided to build a home for Prabhupāda. In time, the plans for the house developed into an ornate memorial shrine of marble, gold and carved teak wood, dedicated posthumously during Labor Day weekend, on Sunday, September 2, 1979. The completion of the Palace of Gold catapulted New Vrindaban into mainstream respectability as tens (and eventually hundreds) of thousands of tourists began visiting the Palace each year. A "Land of Krishna" theme park and a granite "Temple of Understanding" in classical South Indian style were designed to make New Vrindaban a "Spiritual Disneyland". The ground-breaking ceremony of the proposed temple on May 31, 1985, was attended by dozens of dignitaries, including a United States congressman from West Virginia. One publication called it "the most significant and memorable day in the history of New Vrindaban."

== Assault and ensuing expulsion from ISKCON ==
Kīrtanānanda Swāmi under house arrest, 1992

On October 27, 1985, during a New Vrindaban bricklaying marathon, a crazed and distraught devotee bludgeoned Kīrtanānanda on the head with a heavy steel tamping tool.

Some close associates began leaving the community. On March 16, 1987, during their annual meeting at Mayapur, India, the ISKCON Governing Body Commission expelled Kīrtanānanda from the society for various deviations. They claimed he had defied ISKCON policies and had claimed to be the sole spiritual heir to Prabhupāda's movement. Thirteen members voted for the resolution, two abstained, and one member, Bhakti Tirtha Swami, voted against the resolution.

Kīrtanānanda then established his own organization, The Eternal Order of the League of Devotees Worldwide, taking several properties with him. By 1988, New Vrindaban had 13 satellite centers in the United States and Canada, including New Vrindaban. New Vrindaban was excommunicated from ISKCON the same year.

== Criminal conviction and imprisonment ==
In 1990, the US federal government indicted Kīrtanānanda on five counts of racketeering, six counts of mail fraud, and conspiracy to murder two of his opponents in the Hare Krishna movement (Stephen Bryant and Charles St. Denis). The government claimed that he had illegally amassed a profit of more than $10.5 million over four years. It also charged that he ordered the killings because the victims had threatened to reveal his sexual abuse of minors.

On March 29, 1991, Kīrtanānanda was convicted on nine of the 11 charges (the jury failed to reach a verdict on the murder charges), but the Court of Appeals, convinced by the arguments of defense attorney Alan Morton Dershowitz, threw out the convictions, saying that child molestation evidence had unfairly prejudiced the jury against Kīrtanānanda, who was not charged with those crimes. On August 16, 1993, he was released from house arrest in a rented apartment in the Wheeling neighborhood of Warwood, where he had lived for nearly two years, and returned triumphantly to New Vrindaban.

Kīrtanānanda lost his iron grip on the community after the September 1993 "Winnebago Incident" during which he was accidentally discovered in a compromising position with a teenage boy in the back of a Winnebago van, and the community split into two camps: those who still supported Kīrtanānanda and those who challenged his leadership. During this time he retired to his rural retreat at "Silent Mountain" near Littleton, West Virginia.

The challengers eventually ousted Kīrtanānanda and his supporters completely, and ended the "interfaith era" in July 1994 by returning the temple worship services to the standard Indian style advocated by Swami Prabhupada and practiced throughout ISKCON. Most of Kīrtanānanda's followers left New Vrindaban and moved to the Radha Muralidhar Temple in New York City, which remained under Kīrtanānanda's control. New Vrindaban returned to ISKCON in 1998.

In 1996, before Kīrtanānanda's retrial was completed, he pleaded guilty to one count of racketeering (mail fraud). He was sentenced to 20 years in prison but was released on June 16, 2004, because of poor health.

On September 10, 2000, the ISKCON Child Protection Office concluded a 17-month investigation and determined that Kīrtanānanda had molested two boys. He was prohibited from visiting any ISKCON properties for five years and offered conditions for reinstatement within ISKCON:

1. He must contribute at least $10,000 to an organization dedicated to serving Vaishnava youth, such as Children of Krishna, the Association for the Protection of Vaishnava Children, or a gurukula approved by the APVC.
2. He must write apology letters to all the victims described in this letter. In these letters he must fully acknowledge his transgressions of child abuse, and he must take full responsibility for those actions. Also, he must express appropriate remorse, and offer to make amends to the victims. These letters should be sent to the APVC, not directly to the victims.
3. He must undergo a psychological evaluation by a mental health professional pre-approved by the APVC, and he must comply with recommendations for ongoing therapy described in the evaluation report and by the APVC.
4. He must fully comply with all governmental investigations into misconduct on his part.

Kīrtanānanda never satisfied any of these conditions.

== After imprisonment ==
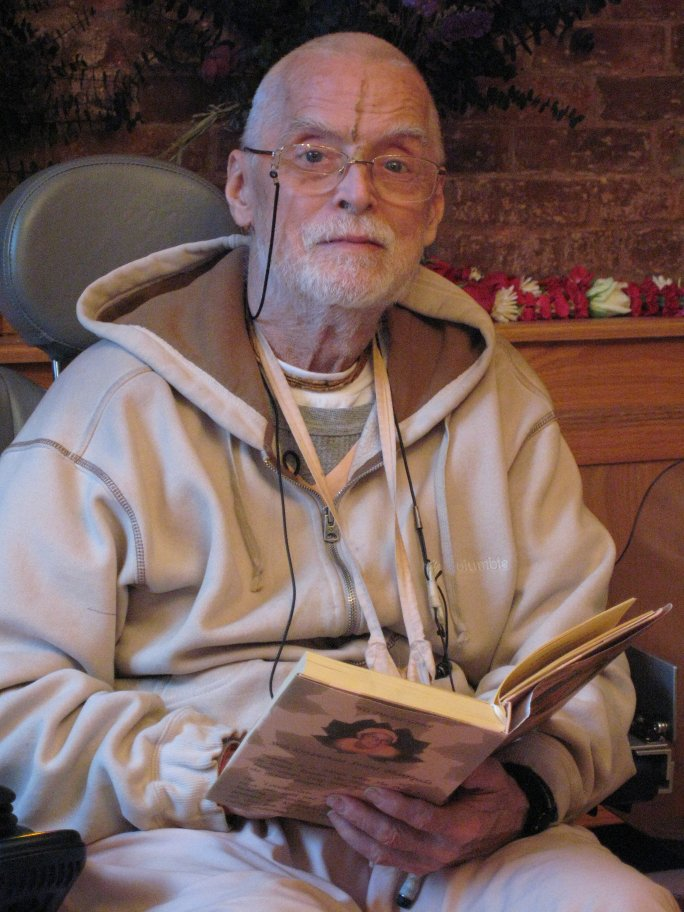
Kīrtanānanda Swami in New York City, March 4, 2008.

For four years after his release from prison, Kīrtanānanda (now using a wheelchair) resided at the Radha Murlidhara Temple at 25 First Avenue in New York City, which was purchased in 1990 for $500,000 and maintained by a small number of disciples and followers, although the temple board later attempted to evict him.

On March 7, 2008, Kīrtanānanda left the United States for India, where he expected to remain for the rest of his life. "There is no sense in staying where I'm not wanted," he explained, referring to the desertions through the years by most of his American disciples and to the attempts to evict him from the building. At the time of his death Kīrtanānanda still had a significant number of loyal disciples in India and Pakistan, who worshiped him as "guru" and published his last books. He continued preaching a message of interfaith: that the God of the Christians, Jews, Muslims, and Vaishnavas is the same; and that men of faith from each religion should recognize and appreciate the faith of men of other paths. "Fundamentalism is one of the most dangerous belief-systems in the world today. Fundamentalism doesn't promote unity; it causes separatism. It creates enmity between people of faith. Look at the Muslims; Mohammed never intended that his followers should spread their religion by the sword. It is more important today than at any other time to preach about the unity of all religions."

== Death ==
Kīrtanānanda died on October 24, 2011, at a hospital in Thane, near Mumbai, India, aged 74. His brother, Gerald Ham, reported the cause of death to be kidney failure.

He named Madhusudan Das (popularly known as ‘Bapuji’), of Anand Vrindavan Dham in Ulhasnagar, Mumbai, as his material and spiritual successor.

== Bibliography ==
Kīrtanānanda Swami authored two dozen published books, some of which were translated and published in Gujarati, German, French and Spanish editions. Some books attributed to him and published in his name were actually written by volunteer ghostwriters. Kīrtanānanda Swami's former disciple, Henry Doktorski, has completed a ten-volume biography of his former spiritual master and a history of the New Vrindaban Community.

The Swami Bhaktipada Archives, which includes personal correspondence, books, magazine, sound recordings, and other memorabilia, are protected for posterity at the West Virginia & Regional History Center, a division of West Virginia University in Morgantown, West Virginia.

Books by Kīrtanānanda Swāmi:

- The Song of God: A Summary Study of Bhagavad-gita As It Is (1984)
- Christ and Krishna: The Path of Pure Devotion (1985)
- L'amour de Dieu: Le Christianisme et La Tradition Bhakti (1985) French edition
- Eternal Love: Conversations with the Lord in the Heart (1986), based on Thomas à Kempis' The Imitation of Christ
- The Song of God: A Summary Study of Bhagavad-gita As It Is (c. 1986) Gujarati edition
- On His Order (1987)
- The Illustrated Ramayana (1987)
- Lila in the Land of Illusion (1987), based on Lewis Carroll's Alice in Wonderland
- Bhaktipada Bullets (1988), compiled by Devamrita Swami
- A Devotee's Journey to the City of God (1988), based on John Bunyan's Pilgrim's Progress
- Joy of No Sex (1988)
- Excerpts from The Bhaktipada Psalms (1988)
- Le pur amour de Dieu: Christ & Krishna (1988), French edition
- One God: The Essence of All Religions (1989), Indian publication
- Heart of the Gita: Always Think of Me (1990)
- How To Say No To Drugs (1990)
- Spiritual Warfare: How to Gain Victory in the Struggle for Spiritual Perfection (1990), a sequel to Eternal Love
- How to Love God (1992), based on Saint Francis de Sales' Treatise on the Love of God
- Sense Grataholics Anonymous: A Twelve Step Meeting Suggested Sharing Format (c. 1995)
- On Becoming Servant of The Servant (undated), Indian publication
- Divine Conversation (2004), Indian publication
- The Answer to Every Problem: Krishna Consciousness (2004), Indian publication
- A Devotee's Handbook for Pure Devotion (2004), Indian publication
- Humbler than a Blade of Grass (2008), Indian publication

Articles and poems by, and interviews with Kīrtanānanda Swami published in Back to Godhead magazine:

- 1966, Vol 01, No 01, (untitled poem, no. 1)
- 1966, Vol 01, No 01, (untitled poem, no. 2)
- 1966, Vol 01, No 01, (untitled poem, no. 3)
- 1966, Vol 01, No 02, (untitled poem, no. 4)
- 1969, Vol 01, No 29, "Man's Link to God"
- 1969, Vol 01, No 31, "Krishna's Light vs. Maya's Night"
- 1970, Vol 01, No 32, "Prasadam: Food for the Body, Food for the Soul and Food for God"
- 1970, Vol 01, No 33, "Observing the Armies on the Battlefield of Kuruksetra, Part 1"
- 1970, Vol 01, No 34, "Contents of the Gita Summarized"
- 1970, Vol 01, No 35, "Karma-yoga—Perfection through Action, Part 3: Sankirtana"
- 1970, Vol 01, No 37, "Transcendental Knowledge, Part 4: He Is Transcendental"
- 1970, Vol 01, No 38, "Karma-yoga—Action in Krishna Consciousness, Part 5: Work in Devotion"
- 1970–1973, Vol 01, No 40, "Sankhya-yoga: Absorption in the Supreme"
- 1970–1973, Vol 01, No 41, "Knowledge of the Absolute: It Is Not a Cheap Thing"
- 1970–1973, Vol 01, No 42, "Attaining the Supreme: What Is Brahman?"
- 1974, Vol 01, No 66, "Turning Our Love Toward Krishna"
- 1977, Vol 12, No 12, "The Things Christ Had to Keep Secret"
- 1986, Vol 21, No 07, "The Heart's Desire: How can we find happiness that is not purchased with our pain?"
