= Richard Rose (mystic) =

American mystic

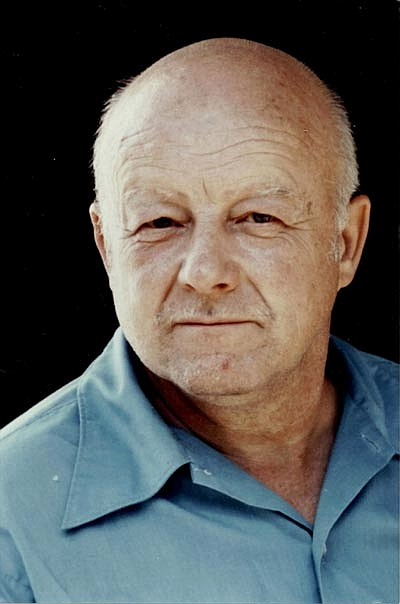
Richard Rose in 1974

Richard Stephen Rose (March 14, 1917 – July 6, 2005) was an American mystic, esoteric philosopher, author, poet, and investigator of paranormal phenomena. He published a number of books and spoke widely in universities and other venues across the country during the 1970s and 1980s.

Rose developed the Albigen System which he described as the "retreat from untruth" an examination of personal belief systems and lifestyles. In that system one discards what one finds to be false on a case-by-case basis. He believed a spiritual "Ultimate truth" exists and can be found for oneself with sufficient application of effort, and recommended skeptical approaches such as his.

Richard Rose set himself apart from mainstream psychology by grounding his approach in Absolute Truth and advocating direct action toward mental clarity and self-improvement. He was highly critical of modern psychology, arguing that it had lost scientific rigor in favor of political trends and conflicting schools of thought. Rose emphasized intuition and direct experience, believing a true psychologist should fully understand another's mind from within. His method, which blended discipline, hard work, and esoteric exploration, proved effective in transforming the lives of many struggling individuals. He insisted that real growth came from action rather than belief, advocating a systematic, no-nonsense approach to both psychology and spiritual work. He studied human psychology, human weakness, and human potential, then wrote challenges to psychology, psychiatry, religion, academia, the legal system, and the New Age movement. His criticism included issues of group-think, dogmatism, financial motives, emotional appeals, and reliance on questionable authorities.

== Biography ==
Richard Stephen Rose was born in Benwood, West Virginia, United States. He entered a Catholic pre-seminary in Butler, Pennsylvania at age 12. He later recounted his delight at the prospect of living with monks and nuns who he believed had direct connection to God but that he was disillusioned by their insistence on blind faith acceptance of what they taught. He left the seminary at age 17, still looking for God, and in college turned toward the study of science as a possible avenue to discovering the nature of reality. Here too he was disillusioned, losing hope that God or Truth might be found through science. After college, he moved around the U.S. in a series of jobs such as on the first nuclear submarine at Babcock & Wilcox in Alliance, Ohio; on streptomycin at the National Jewish Medical & Research Center in Denver; and performing metallurgical testing for Martin Aircraft in Baltimore.

While living in Baltimore, his older brother James was killed on a Merchant Marine vessel when it was torpedoed by a German U-boat. This death provided a huge shock to Rose, who contrasted his brother's selfless attitude to his own spiritual ego.

Rose was working in the spring of 1947 as a waiter at a tennis club in Seattle when he experienced what he described as "God Realization". Several months later, he wrote a description of what had occurred in The Three Books of the Absolute.

A few years later he married and raised a family. He supported the family as a painting contractor and by raising cattle on the family farm. He worked with people who were interested in parapsychological phenomena such as ESP and hypnosis, but said he never came across anyone working to answer questions about the nature of the mind and reality. During this period he compiled his first book, The Albigen Papers, outlining his philosophy, but it was not published until 1973.

In 1972 Rose was invited to give a talk at the Theosophical Society in Pittsburgh. Two students from the University of Pittsburgh attended, and they were inspired to start a group at the university to apply Rose's teaching. In 1973, Rose and a handful of students set up the TAT Foundation — "a circle of friends with no head" — to promote their efforts to reach out to others. The acronym TAT stood for "Truth and Transmission." The Pittsburgh group spawned groups at other northeastern universities and even a couple of western locations (Denver and Los Angeles). Rose made his farm available for group gatherings and individual retreats, and students built two large buildings for meetings as well as cabins for individual use. The following two decades saw hundreds of people inspired to launch their own spiritual searches.

Rose continued to write and publish while his study groups expanded. His public lectures continued until the early 1990s, when he started to show signs of deterioration from Alzheimer's disease.

== Teachings ==
Richard Rose's widow, Betty (Cecy) Rose still keeps the writings and audio lectures of her late husband widely available to seekers all across the globe. Her correspondence with enquirers also continues through Richard Rose Teachings (www.richardroseteachings.com), a site dedicated to both his publications and those of others that he recommended to his students. Rose Publications also continues to distribute his writings.

Rose's student David Gold described his work as esoteric and direct. Rose chose not to establish a popular movement of students, instead preferring a sub-rosa network of close students, who then reached out to a larger circle, which included author Joseph Chilton Pearce.

=== Tenets ===
His student John Kent felt Rose's teachings were difficult to describe, because Rose stressed inner work inherently subjective and intimate to each individual. They were more about pursuing personal insight and introspection than a set of specific techniques. Nonetheless, according to Kent, Rose did formulate a system of teachings based on his study of other traditions and his own insights. Kent summarized the core questions in the teachings as:

1. Who am I (ultimately)?
2. Where did I come from (before birth)?
3. Where am I going (after death)?

Rose recommends a deep investigation of "who" is living and experiencing: clearly defining self and ego. He also insisted that a life of activity is meaningless as long as the identity of the actor is not known. He thought approaching spirituality as a way to find peace or enhance one's life, which he called "utilitarian," was foolish. Instead he advocated total dedication to a search for truth — in particular concerning self and ego — in spite of the personal consequences.

He used the term "Jacob's Ladder" (image) as a kind of transpersonal map. Based on that, he then used the terms "Law of the Ladder" and "Ladder Work" to describe different levels he observed among those seeking truth. He also believed that one could only effectively help, or be helped by, others who were on the same or adjacent rungs of the ladder. He felt "extra-proportional returns" were realized when a group of people combine their efforts in any endeavor, which he called the "Contractor's Law".

Rose cautioned against postulating what truth — with respect to self and ego, for example — should be and then trying to move toward it. Instead one removes misunderstandings. His working definition of truth was "a condition from which all untruth has been removed." He used the phrases "retreat from error" and "reverse vector" to describe the process of moving away from the most obviously false, what he called "garbage," which would clarify the thinking and intuition to a point where more subtle untruth could be evaluated.

He published The Albigen Papers in 1973, which he called a guidebook for seekers. His theories about the transmutation of energy from the body through the mind up to what he called the "spiritual quantum," were published after that and similar to some recent theories describing the mind as a force-field. He produced a pamphlet on a method of meditation involving the dispassionate review of past traumatic events as a way to overcome psychological problems and to understand the ego. His book Psychology of the Observer encapsulated his views on the structure of mind-processes and what he described as the internal ascent from a personal, conflicted view of the world to a more Universal perspective.

He was a hypnotist, occasionally giving demonstrations, and said that understanding hypnotism was a key to understanding the mechanics of the mind. His criticism of spiritual and New Age movements often included references to their use of self-hypnotic methods.

=== Recommended Study ===
His student John Kent described the culmination of Rose's philosophy as corresponding "most closely with the nondualism of Advaita Vedanta". But Kent also writes that rather than presenting a concept-structure or a specific practice upon which his teachings could be based Rose instead advocated personal immersion into available methods and religious styles while always applying what he called "respectful doubt." Consequently, his followers obtained an understanding of a wide number of esoteric groups and methods, which they were able to bring back and share among themselves. Rose also believed that progress on one's spiritual path was linked to one's efforts at helping others.

Rose recommended a number of authors to his students and disparaged other authors, based on his research. Those he most highly recommended were Indian guru Ramana Maharshi, Chan master Huang Po, Christian mystics St. John of the Cross and Teresa of Avila, George Gurdjieff, and researchers Paul Brunton and Richard Bucke. In Albigen Papers he described H.P. Blavatsky's books as "some of the most valuable a student can own," and in his publication of Profound Writings East & West, called her text Book of Golden Precepts (also Voice of the Silence) as "a condensed guide to the deepest teachings of mankind." Rose advocated the study of what he called thaumaturgical laws as a means to protect oneself from unseen influences, for anyone who would explore the dimensions of consciousness ("the mind dimension"), referring to texts by Eliphas Levi and others.

=== Teaching Style and Methods ===
According to Kent, Rose advocated a very personal commitment similar to Gurdjieff and he discouraged casual commitment. Aspects of his style which discouraged casual commitment included: a Zen-like method of confrontation, recommending a celibate lifestyle, and strong criticism of what he described as social and political sacred cows. In personal interactions he would attempt to dispel illusions and falsehoods that students were hiding from themselves. This sharpness caused his students to call him a Zen master, even though he was highly critical of mainstream Zen. In fact, the first group established by Rose was called Zen Study Group, in Pittsburgh, reflecting his embrace of Zen methods, and other groups were called Pyramid Zen Society, an admission that those interested in total commitment would be few (the top of the pyramid) as explained in various recorded talks. He felt that requiring students to be determined would produce a more committed group of thinkers and researchers.

Rose gave a series of lectures in the 1970s which outlined his approach to Zen and which incorporated the term Zen in the title: The Psychology of Zen; Zen and Common Sense; Zen and Death; etc. Several of these have been transcribed from the audio tapes and published. He published for limited circulation a paper titled The Monitor Papers which established rules, guidelines and techniques to be observed during confrontation in the private group meetings where confrontation was permitted.

Rose had a high regard for Alfred Pulyan, a Zen teacher in Connecticut, who gave him a method of Transmission referred to in Zen literature. Rose wrote a handbook for local group leaders, The Monitor Papers, currently unpublished, giving instructions on how to create rapport, which in his view is a precursor to Transmission, and he published Energy Transmutation, Between-ness and Transmission in 1975.

Stemming from his investigations into Spiritualism, in his early lectures he often related his findings on paranormal phenomena.

== Influence ==
He worked closely with groups, beginning with university students and professional people, mostly in the Northeast (e.g. Pennsylvania, Ohio, Massachusetts, Maryland, West Virginia). Over time, as the students graduated and entered professional lives, groups were also established in Colorado, California, North Carolina, Florida, and Maine. After he was hospitalized with Alzheimer's in the mid-1990s, many of the organizations failed, but some continued - notably, the Self Knowledge Symposium founded by August Turak at universities in North Carolina.

His followers believe he never pursued widespread popularity. Members of the TAT Foundation, the current umbrella organization, are dispersed geographically. People may attend study groups without becoming actual members of the umbrella group.

== New Vrindaban ==
In 1967, Rose attempted to create an ashram of spiritual seekers on his Marshall County, West Virginia farm, and composed a letter which was published in the San Francisco Oracle expressing his desire to try "to form an ashram of sorts here in West Virginia, in the rural section where I own about a half a section. The conception is one of a non-profit, non-interfering, non-denominational, retreat or refuge, where philosophers might come to work communally together, or independently,—where a library and other facilities might be developed.",

Among the seekers who responded to his letter were Hare Krishna devotees Kirtanananda Swami (Keith Gordon Ham) and his partner Hayagriva Das (Howard Morton Wheeler). The two secured a 99-year lease on Rose's backwoods farm which eventually developed into the sprawling New Vrindaban Community which eventually included Prabhupada's Palace of Gold, and this community pressed against Rose's farm from all sides. When Rose attempted to fight the Krishnas in court and win back his land for non-payment of taxes, there was some talk at the community about "eliminating" him, and a hit man allegedly followed him for a while. Despite his troubles with the Krishnas, Rose reportedly never expressed outright regret over his decision to lease his back farm to them. "In some ways the Krishnites are better to have around than the hillbillies," Rose said once. "At least they don't get drunk and steal the radiators out of your trucks."

== Publications ==
- Albigen Papers, 1973, 1978 ISBN 1-878683-00-4, ISBN 1-878683-07-1
- Energy Transmutation, Between-ness and Transmission, 1975 ISBN 1-878683-02-0
- Psychology of the Observer, 1979, 2001 ISBN 1-878683-06-3
- Meditation, 1981 Pyramid Press
- Carillon: Poems, Essays & Philosophy, 1982 ISBN 1-878683-03-9
- The Direct-Mind Experience, 1985 ISBN 1-878683-01-2
- Profound Writings, East & West, 1988 ISBN 1-878683-05-5
- "The Three Books of the Absolute" appears in The Albigen Papers and in Profound Writings, East & West.
