= Henry Doktorski =

American accordionist, organist and author

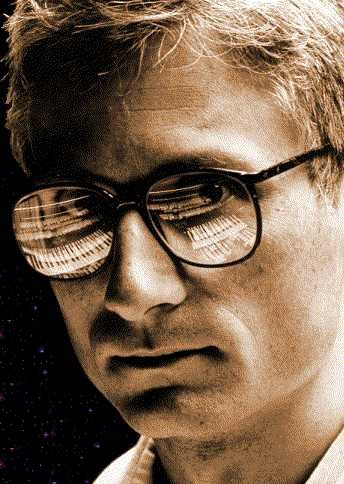
Henry Doktorski, c. 1992

Henry Doktorski III (born January 30, 1956) is an American accordionist, organist and author.

Doktorski is the author of Killing for Krishna: The Danger of Deranged Devotion (2018), a 660-page nonfiction true-crime book about history of the New Vrindavan Hare Krishna community and the assassination of an American Hare Krishna devotee in 1986. He is also the author of Eleven Naked Emperors: The Crisis of Charismatic Succession in the Hare Krishna Movement (1977-1987), published in 2020, as well as ten volumes of Gold, Guns and God: Swami Bhaktipada and the West Virginia Hare Krishnas (2020–2023).

== Early life ==
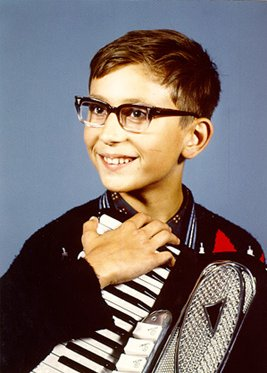
Doktorski, c. 1966

Henry Doktorski III was born in New Brunswick, New Jersey, to Polish-American parents Henry A. Doktorski and Theresa Maria Czartowicz, and grew up in East Brunswick. He cites his Polish background—accordions being often featured in Polish folk music—as a main factor in his childhood decision to take up the accordion rather than a different instrument. At the age of seven he began studying accordion.

As a pre-teenager during the mid-1960s he played ethnic music and jazz standards (inspired by Myron Floren from the Lawrence Welk television show), but as a teenager during the late 1960s and early 1970s his musical tastes changed, and he began playing the accordion in a rock band which performed the music of The Beatles, Grand Funk Railroad, Carlos Santana and Black Sabbath.

On June 7, 1971, he was awarded the rank of Eagle Scout in the Boy Scouts of America (Troop 28 in East Brunswick), and received a Good Citizen Award from The American Legion.

== Discovering classical music ==
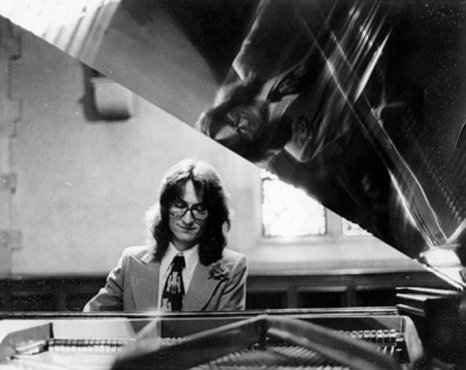
Doktorski at Park College, Parkville, Missouri, 1978

At Saint Peters High School in New Brunswick, Doktorski discovered classical music after joining the school choir, and his life's direction became more clear. He began studying classical piano at the age of 16 and became proficient enough to win a scholarship as a piano major at Park College (today Park University) in Parkville, Missouri (near North Kansas City). There Doktorski studied piano with Robert C. Anderson, acted in and served as music director for several musicals (The Good Woman of Setzuan, Godspell, Scarpino Bambino, Damn Yankees, and Jacques Brel Is Alive and Well and Living in Paris), sang as a chorus member with the Kansas City Lyric Opera and the Independence, Missouri Messiah Choir, and performed piano, harpsichord and celesta with the Northland Symphony Orchestra.

He was elected to Who's Who Among Students at American Universities and Colleges from 1976 to 1978, and was nominated as a candidate for the post of 1977 Harvest Festival King.

== Life with the Hare Krishnas ==
In August 1978, hardly three months after finishing college, Doktorski's life changed dramatically when he joined the Hare Krishna movement at the rural New Vrindaban Community in Marshall County, West Virginia. He explained that he was unhappy with his life, and wanted to develop his spiritual side: "In college, I discovered music; the answer to my search for happiness. ... But I was miserable. ... If I wanted to compose, conduct and perform music which would awaken suffering humanity to the platform of love of God, first I would have to become a pure devotee [of God]. Only then would my talent have any value."

Doktorski began following the principles and practices of Gaudiya Vaishnavism as delineated by A. C. Bhaktivedanta Swami Prabhupada (1896–1977), the Indian guru and Founder-Acharya of the International Society for Krishna Consciousness (ISKCON). He accepted initiation on March 13, 1979, from Kirtanananda Swami Bhaktipada (1937–2011), the ISKCON guru and founder of New Vrindaban, and was awarded the Sanskrit name "Hrishikesh dasa" ("Servant of Krishna, who is master of the senses").

During his time in the New Vrindaban Community, Doktorski helped build Prabhupada's Palace of Gold and briefly taught at the gurukula (grade school). In 1985 he helped establish the first office for the publication and distribution for Bhaktipada's books (Bhakti Books, later to be known as Palace Publishing).

== Returning to the accordion ==
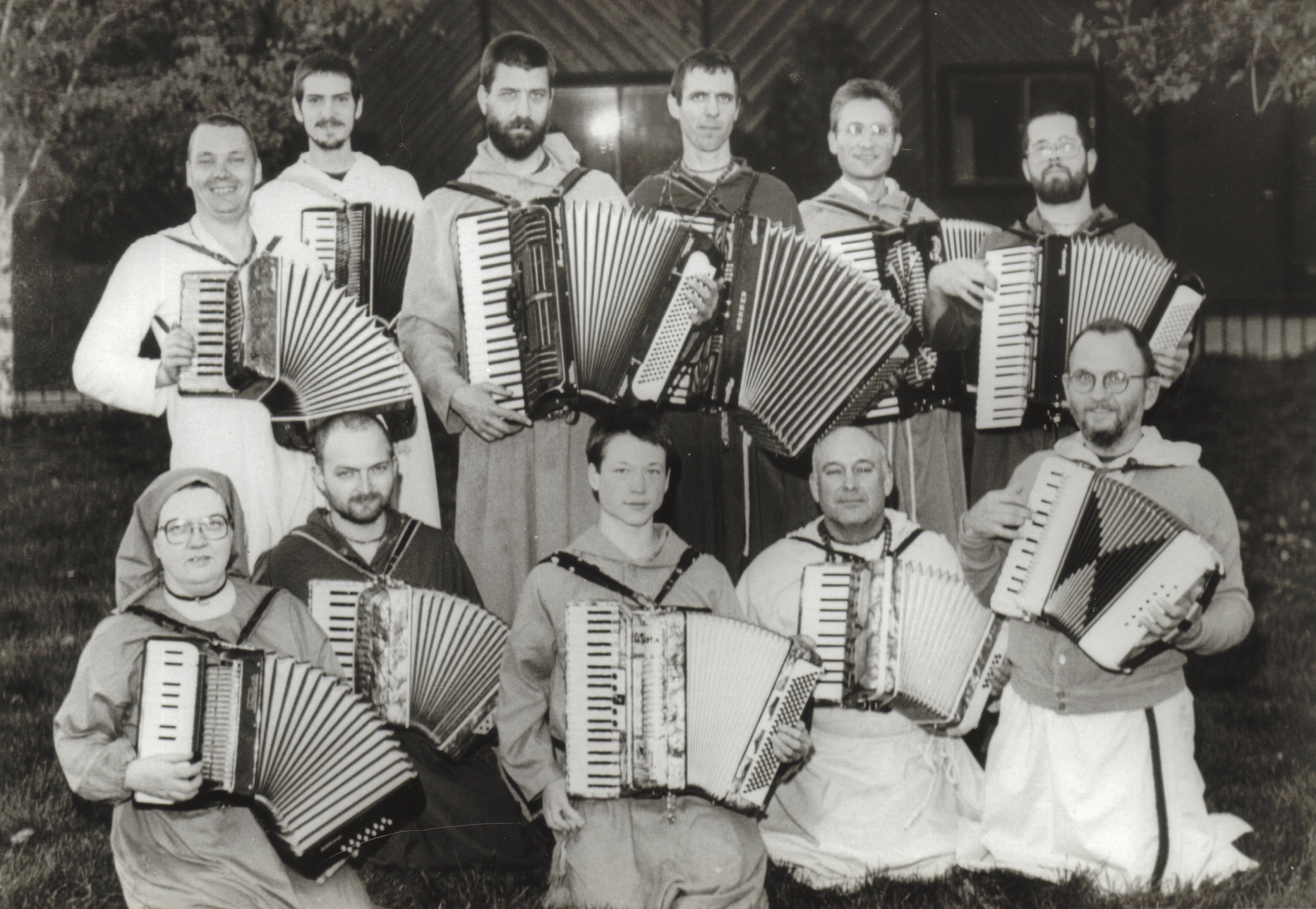
City of God Accordion Ensemble (1989)

Later Doktorski served as the Minister of Music (principal organist, choirmaster, orchestra director and composer-in-residence) during the New Vrindaban "City of God" interfaith era from 1986 until 1993. He composed music and performed for the three daily temple services (5 a.m., noon, and 7 p.m.) During this time, at the request of his guru, he picked up his accordion again after many years, and began playing it during the evening services. The accordion was a hit and several monks asked him to teach them how to play.

He formed and directed an accordion orchestra which gave their debut performance at the Wheeling City of Lights parade on November 17, 1989. This accordion ensemble won trophies at the American Accordion Musicological Society convention (King of Prussia, Pennsylvania, March 1990), the American Accordionists Association convention (Washington D.C., July 1990), and the Accordion Teacher's Guild 50th Anniversary Celebration (Kansas City, Missouri, August 1990). Doktorski himself won first place in the American Accordion Musicological Society virtuoso solo competition.

In 1990, the American composer Alan Hovhaness composed a brief work entitled Hymn for Doktorski, which Doktorski recorded on his 2005 CD Classical Accordion Recital. This CD was selected for admission into the collection of The Alan Hovhaness International Research Centre in Yerevan, Armenia.

In October 1993, Doktorski abandoned his service at the New Vrindaban Community when he became convinced about allegations regarding his guru's inappropriate sexual conduct with young men. Doktorski participated in the grassroots movement which questioned Bhaktipada's qualifications for leadership, and eventually recommended returning New Vrindaban to the temple worship style as advocated by the ISKCON founder and acharya, Swami Prabhupada.

Doktorski left the community in April 1994, and moved to Pittsburgh, Pennsylvania, where he was awarded a graduate assistantship at Duquesne University. He received a Master of Music degree with a major in composition in 1997. From 1997 to 2015 he served on the faculty of the City Music Center of Duquesne University Mary Pappert School of Music.

== Concert accordionist ==
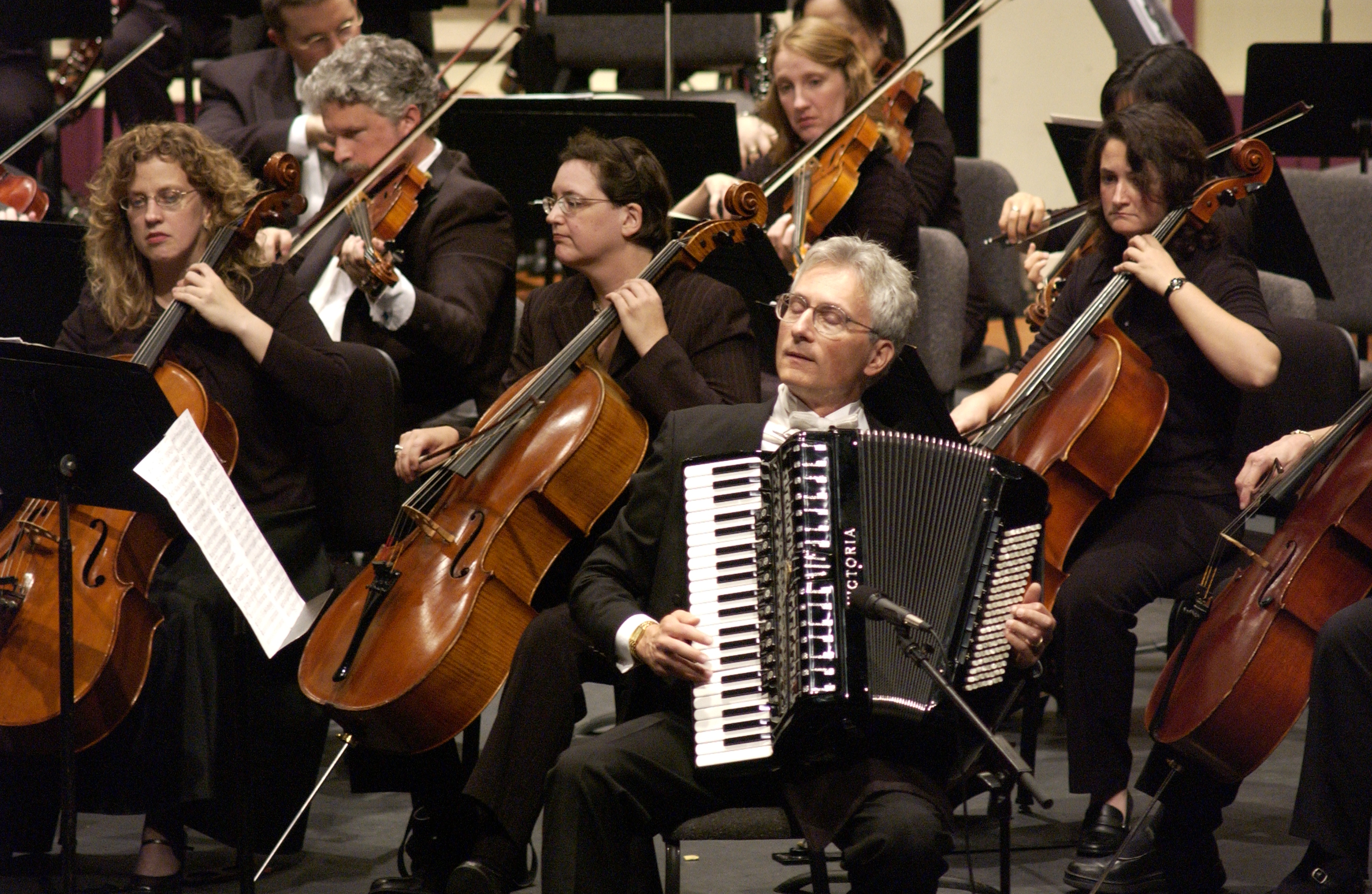
Doktorski with the New Philharmonic Orchestra

After moving to Pittsburgh, Doktorski attempted to capitalize on his classical accordion expertise, with some success. Between 1995 and 2005 he performed with the Pittsburgh Symphony Orchestra forty times (on accordion, piano, harpsichord, organ, and celesta).

From 1997 to 2015 Doktorski served as instructor of accordion on the faculty of the City Music Center at Duquesne University. He also served for two seasons as instructor of accordion at the Fairbanks Summer Arts Festival at the University of Alaska Fairbanks.

In 1997, Doktorski founded The Classical Free-Reed, Inc.—a nonprofit educational organization devoted to the accordion and classical music.

== Recordings ==
Doktorski was featured as accordion soloist in six compact discs:

- A Classical Christmas with the Pittsburgh Chamber Orchestra (Alanna Records, 1993),
- Music by George Gershwin with the Duquesne Chamber Players (Alanna Records, 1998—This CD was part of a tribute for the 100th anniversary of Gershwin's birth),
- Vaudeville Accordion Classics: The Complete Works of Guido Deiro (2003 solo album, Bridge Records),
- Classical Accordion Recital (2005 solo album, The Classical Free-Reed, Inc.),
- Celebrated Polkas by Pietro Deiro (2006 solo album, The Classical Free-Reed, Inc.),
- Ave Maria: Hymns to Mary (2007 solo album, The Classical Free-Reed, Inc.).

Joseph McLellan of The Washington Post described Doktorski's A Classical Christmas as "the most interesting instrumental collection of Christmas music this year".

Gramophone magazine reported highly of his two-disc album of historic original works for accordion from the 1910s and 1920s released by Bridge Records—Vaudeville Accordion Classics: "It takes only a few tracks—impeccably performed by Henry Doktorski and, just as importantly, superbly engineered to Bridge's standards—to show the visceral appeal to audiences of its day."

Doktorski also played accordion with Itzhak Perlman and the Pittsburgh Symphony Orchestra under the direction of John Williams on the 1997 Sony Classical Records CD (SK 63005) Cinema Serenade which appeared on the Billboard Classical Crossover Chart for 92 weeks, where it reached number one.

== Author-composer ==
Doktorski has become known as a Hare Krishna historian, and to date has published twelve books about the International Society for Krishna Consciousness, Swami Bhaktipada and the New Vrindaban Krishna Community:

- Killing For Krishna--The Danger of Deranged Devotion (2018),
- Eleven Naked Emperors--The Crisis of Charismatic Succession in the Hare Krishna Movement (2020),
- Gold, Guns and God: Swami Bhaktipada and the West Virginia Hare Krishnas: Vol. 1: A Crazy Man (2020),
- Gold, Guns and God: Swami Bhaktipada and the West Virginia Hare Krishnas: Vol. 2: A Pioneer Community (2021).
- Gold, Guns and God: Swami Bhaktipada and the West Virginia Hare Krishnas: Vol. 3: Prabhupada's Palace of Gold (2020),
- Gold, Guns and God: Swami Bhaktipada and the West Virginia Hare Krishnas: Vol. 4: Deviations in the Dhama (2021).
- Gold, Guns and God: Swami Bhaktipada and the West Virginia Hare Krishnas: Vol. 5: The Murder and the Mandir (2020).
- Gold, Guns and God: Swami Bhaktipada and the West Virginia Hare Krishnas: Vol. 6: The Guru Business (2022).
- Gold, Guns and God: Swami Bhaktipada and the West Virginia Hare Krishnas: Vol. 7: Trials and Tribulations (2022).
- Gold, Guns and God: Swami Bhaktipada and the West Virginia Hare Krishnas: Vol. 8: The City of God (2022).
- Gold, Guns and God: Swami Bhaktipada and the West Virginia Hare Krishnas: Vol. 9: Pushed Out Completely (2023).
- Gold, Guns and God: Swami Bhaktipada and the West Virginia Hare Krishnas: Vol. 10: The Final Pastimes (2023).
- Sicarios Por Krishna--El Peligro de la Devoción Desquiciada (2019), a Spanish translation of Killing For Krishna,
- Uccidere per Krishna--Il Pericolo di una Devozione Squilibrata (2021), an Italian translation of Killing For Krishna,
- Oro, Pistole e Dio: Vol. 1--Un Folle: Swami Bhaktipada e gli Hare Krishna del West Virginia (2024), an Italian translation of Gold, Guns and God: Swami Bhaktipada and the West Virginia Hare Krishnas: Vol. 1: A Crazy Man,
- The Disastrous Decade: The Zonal Acharya Era of ISKCON (1977-1987) (2025), an abridged version of Eleven Naked Emperors.

Doktorski also served as a consultant for the seven-part 2019 Wondery podcast series American Scandal: The Hare Krishna Murders, as well as appearing in the 2017 documentary film by Investigation Discovery titled Krishna Killers from the series The 1980s: The Deadliest Decade. In addition, Doktorski has had articles published in the Brijabasi Spirit and Sampradaya Sun. Along with E. Burke Rochford Jr., he co-authored a chapter in the 2013 SUNY Press book, "Homegrown Gurus".

He has written over 130 reviews as well as dozens of articles which can be read on The Classical Free-Reed, Inc. website. His pioneering research work, The Classical Squeezebox—A Short History of the Accordion in Classical Music was published by the British international journal Musical Performance. His book, The Brothers Deiro and Their Accordions, was the first published biography of those two early accordion pioneers: Guido Deiro and Pietro Deiro. His How To Play Diatonic Button Accordion Method Book & CD was published by Santorella Publications. He has also recorded for Santorella Publications.

Doktorski has written CD booklet notes for Bridge Records and Archeophone Records. His Complete Works of Guido Deiro printed music anthology was published by Mel Bay Publications in 2008.

Doktorski is a member of Pi Kappa Lambda, the academic honor society in the field of music, and is a member of the advisory and editorial board for The Center for the Study of Free-Reed Instruments at the Graduate School and University Center of the City University of New York. His composition Serenade for oboe and harp was recorded by Pittsburgh Symphony Orchestra members oboist James Gorton and harpist Gretchen Van Hoesen, on Boston Records CD (BR1015) Pavanes, Pastorales, and Serenades.

Today Doktorski serves as organist for House of Prayer Lutheran Church in Escondido, California (he was awarded the title of Colleague by the American Guild of Organists). He is the former conductor for the Alcoa Singers of Pittsburgh, and a former a chess instructor and tournament director for Silver Knights Chess. He also served as a chess instructor for the Temecula California Chess Club.
