= F. Gerald Ham =

American archivist and educator (1930–2021)

- Born: Francis Gerald Ham; April 13, 1930; Toms River, New Jersey
- Died: June 5, 2021 (aged 91); Madison, Wisconsin
- Other name: Jerry Ham
- Education: Wheaton College; University of Kentucky
- Occupations: archivist; teacher
- Employers: Wisconsin Historical Society; University of Wisconsin–Madison
- Notable work: "The Archival Edge"

Francis Gerald "Jerry" Ham (April 13, 1930 – June 5, 2021) was an American archivist and educator, and served as state archivist of Wisconsin between 1964 and 1990. Ham also founded the archival education program at the University of Wisconsin-Madison and served as president of the Society of American Archivists (1973-1974).

== Career ==
Gerald Ham was born in Toms River, New Jersey, the eldest son of conservative Baptist minister Francis Gordon Ham and his wife Marjorie, and studied history at Wheaton College in Illinois. While there he met Elsie Jeane Magill, who he married in 1953. He continued his education at the University of Kentucky, receiving a master's degree and Ph.D. in history.

In 1964, Ham was appointed the state archivist for Wisconsin, administering the Division of Archives and Manuscripts at the Wisconsin Historical Society. In 1966 he was invited to establish an archival education program within the School of Library and Information Studies at the University of Wisconsin-Madison, which he taught for 25 years.

Ham was also deeply involved with the Society of American Archivists (SAA) throughout his career. He served on SAA Council and as president of the organization between 1973 and 1974. In this role he helped modernize the Society, hiring its first executive director and advocating for changes in archival practice in the United States.

In 1998, Ham and his wife endowed the Society of American Archivists' F. Gerald Ham and Elsie Ham Scholarship. This merit-based scholarship provides funding for graduate studies in archival studies.

Ham retired as an archivist in 1990. His younger brother, Keith Gordon Ham, better known as the Kirtanananda Swami, died in 2011.

Ham himself died on June 5, 2021, in Madison, Wisconsin.

== Noted works ==
- F. Gerald Ham, "The Archival Edge," American Archivist 38, no. 1 (1975): 5-13.
- F. Gerald Ham, "Archival Choices: Managing the Historical Record in an Age of Abundance," American Archivist 47, no. 1 (Winter 1984): 11-22
- F. Gerald Ham, Selecting and Appraising Archives and Manuscripts (Chicago, Ill.: Society of American Archivists, 1993)
