= Deiro =

Deiro is a surname. Notable people with the surname include:

- Guido Deiro (1886–1950), Italian vaudeville star, recording artist, composer, and teacher
- Pietro Deiro (1888–1954), Italian accordionist
