= Guido Deiro =

American songwriter (1886–1950)

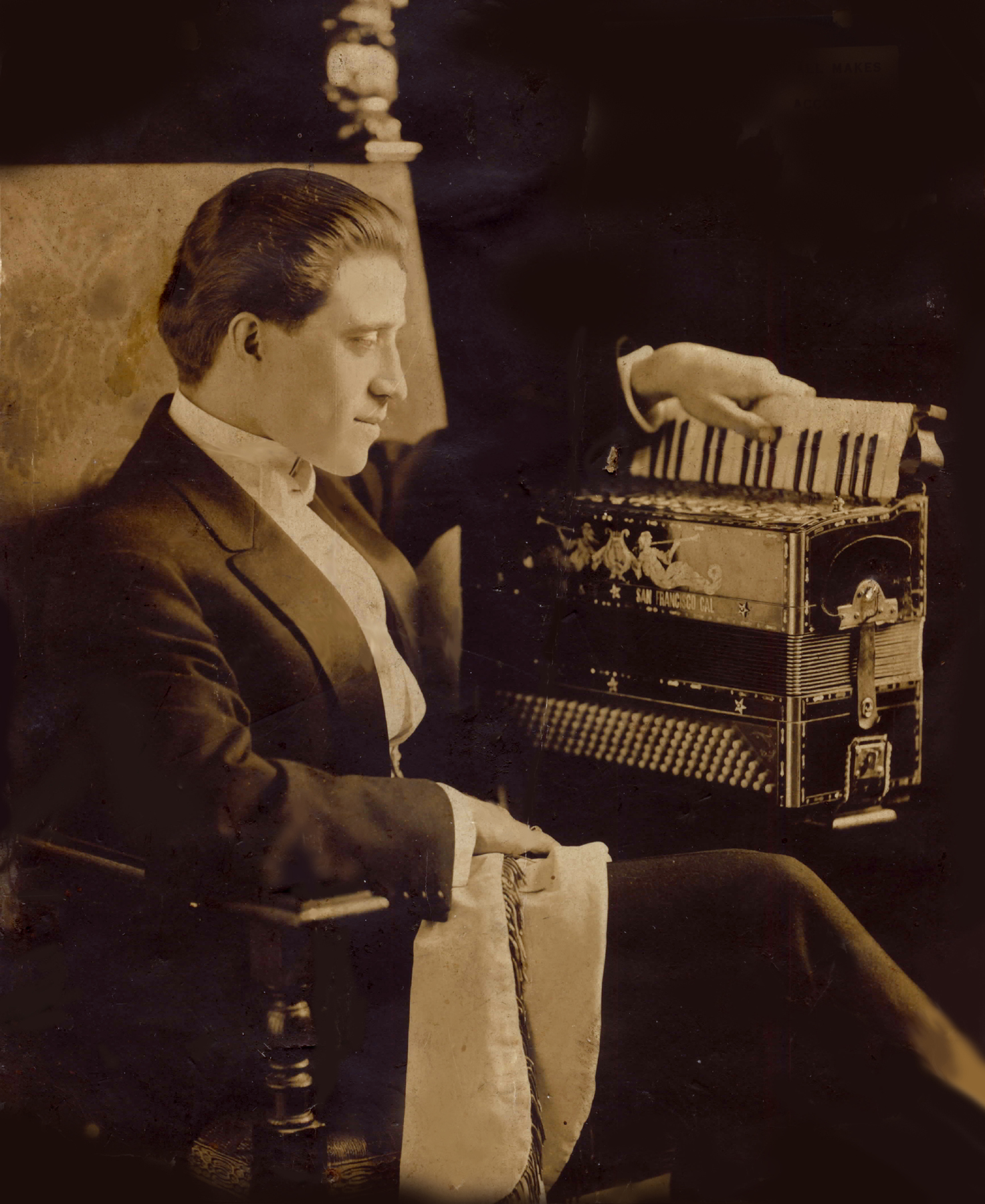
Count Guido Pietro Deiro, c. 1909

Count Guido Pietro Deiro (1 September 1886 – 26 July 1950) was a famous vaudeville star, international recording artist, composer and teacher. He was the first piano-accordionist to appear on big-time vaudeville, records, radio and the screen. he usually performed under the stage-name "Deiro". Guido and his younger brother Pietro Deiro (known as "Pietro") were among the highest-paid musicians on the vaudeville circuit, and they both did much to introduce and popularize the piano accordion in the early 20th century.

== Early life ==
Guido Pietro Deiro was born in the village of Salto Canavese, in the fraction of Deiro, near Turin, Italy. His family was rural Italian nobility who were involved in raising dairy cattle, growing wine grapes, tending orchards, and operating general stores to sell their produce. While a young boy, Guido entertained himself by playing the ocarina, an ancient flute-like wind instrument usually made from ceramic or wood. His uncle Fred noticed Guido’s unusual musical ability on the ocarina, and decided to get him a more sophisticated instrument, a diatonic button accordion. Guido started to play the accordion when nine years old. His father allowed Guido to play this two-row accordion in the street outside his stores because Guido’s playing would draw a crowd and attract potential customers. Deiro became a student of the famous Italian accordionist-composer Giovanni Gagliardi.

== Career ==
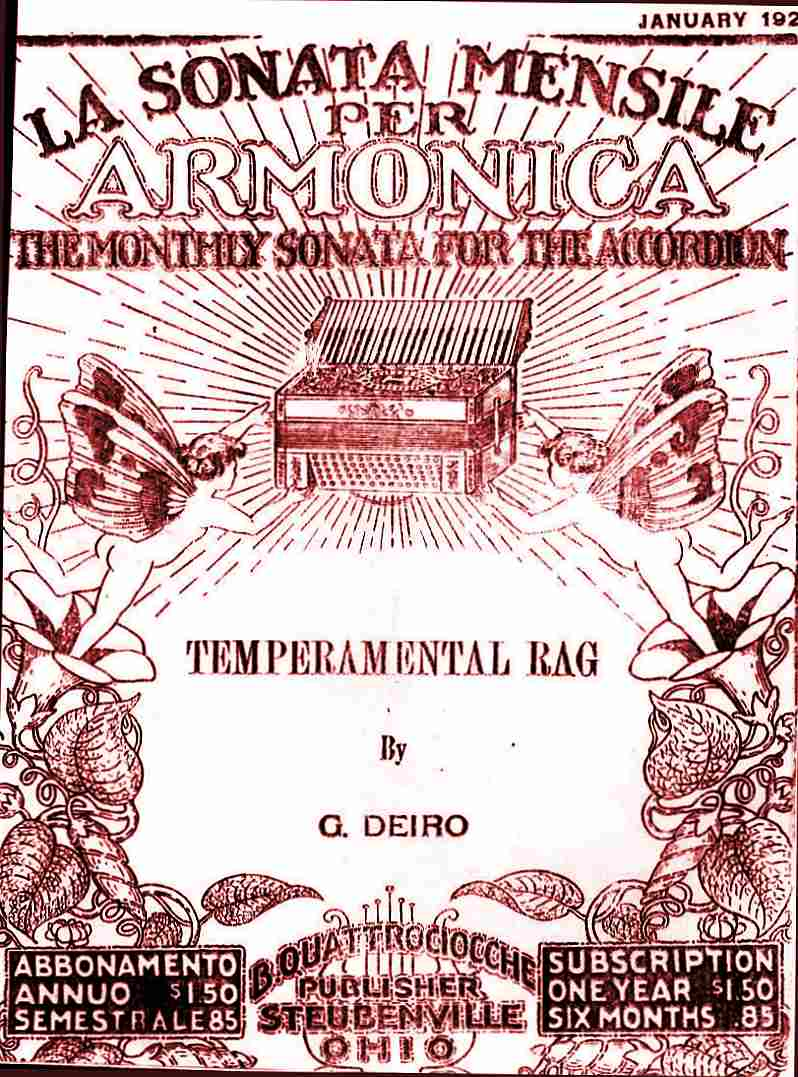
Sheet music 1922

Deiro left his home to avoid an arranged marriage, and defying his father's wishes that he manage the family businesses, he became a professional entertainer and took engagements in France and Germany playing the chromatic accordion. His success as a performer led the Ranco-Vercelli accordion company in Italy to ask him to demonstrate their new piano-accordions at the Alaska–Yukon–Pacific Exposition in 1908. This world's fair was held in Seattle from June to October 1909. After the fair, he stayed on in Seattle working as a musician in saloons. By this time, he had become a virtuoso at playing a piano accordion. In 1910 he was discovered by an agent for the Orpheum Vaudeville Circuit. His opening debut was at the American Theatre in San Francisco (managed by Sid Grauman) on June 15, 1910. He became an immediate sensation, and began traveling the vaudeville circuit routinely back and forth across the United States and Canada (and other countries as well) as a headliner. During his travels, he met and became friends with another famous Italian accordionist: Pietro Frosini.

In addition to playing the popular hits of the day and light classical and operatic fare, Deiro composed his own original compositions. In 1911, Deiro wrote the hit song "Kismet" which became the theme song of a successful Broadway musical (1911) and was also featured in two Hollywood movies (1921, 1930). During his lifetime, he recorded more than 110 songs (primarily for Columbia Records, and occasionally for Edison phonograph cylinders). The records were enormously popular, and, along with his vaudeville stardom, helped to propel Deiro to the status of a minor celebrity in American culture.

Throughout the teens and well into the 1920s, Deiro was a dominant voice of accordion. As Deiro showcased the piano accordion through his vaudeville performances across the United States, more and more people were introduced to the instrument, the popularity of the accordion increased. In 1928, Deiro was featured in an early sound film, Vitaphone #2968, titled GUIDO DEIRO: The World's Foremost Piano-Accordionist. He appeared as an accordionist in several other motion pictures, such as the musical Shine on Harvest Moon and the Carole Lombard comedy The Other Man.

== Marriages ==
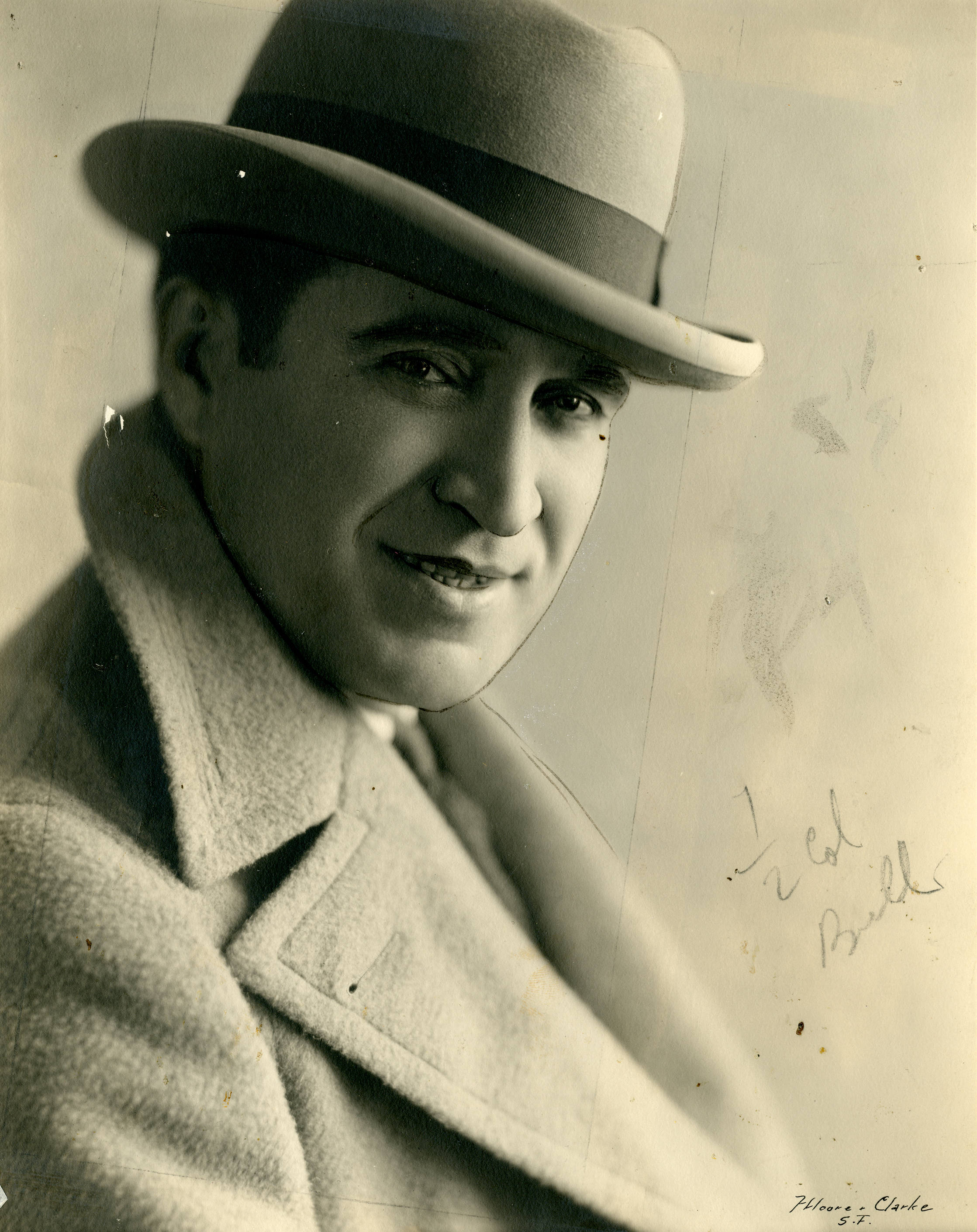
Deiro in 1920

Deiro's son Guido claims in his book Mae West and the Count that Deiro married West in 1914, yet it was not made public as she was married to fellow vaudevillian Frank Szatkus. West and Deiro traveled together, appearing all over the country, before their alleged divorce in 1920. According to the American Masters documentary "Mae West: Dirty Blonde", West aborted Deiro's child on the advice of her mother, the procedure nearly killing her and leaving her barren, and Deiro was devastated when he learned what she had done, thus ending the relationship. Deiro's other marriages were to Julia Tatro (1913), Ruby Lang (1920-1927?), and Yvonne Teresa Le Baron de Forrest (1937–1941).

== Final years ==
Deiro continued to play vaudeville shows until at least 1935 and performed on two world tours, although after 1929, he traveled less and focused his career on the west coast of the United States. During the 1930s, he opened a number of accordion studios and taught and sold accordions. He also gave musical coaching to a young virtuoso accordionist-entertainer from Fresno, California: Dick Contino. After World War II, he lost most of his studios. He became ill in 1947, and died of congestive heart failure in 1950 at age 63.

== Legacy ==
Although Deiro's substantial musical contributions were forgotten in no small part due to his brother's promotional claims and the passage of time, beginning in 2001 there has been a revival of interest in the music of Guido Deiro, primarily due to the efforts of his son, Count Guido Roberto Deiro, and his collaboration with American concert accordionist, historian and author Henry Doktorski. The two have worked together to (1) create a website dedicated to Deiro which went online in 2001, (2) record the complete works of Deiro: Vaudeville Accordion Classics, Bridge Records 9138 A/B (2003), (3) release The Complete Recorded Works of Guido Deiro, Vols. 1, 2, 3 and 4, Archeophone Records 5012, 5014, 5018 and 5019) (2007-2010), and (4) edit and publish The Complete Works of Guido Deiro Printed Music Anthology, Mel Bay Publications (2008). (See external links below.)

In addition, Doktorski has written a biography of the two Deiro brothers: The Brothers Deiro and Their Accordions (The Classical Free-Reed, Inc., Oakdale, Pennsylvania: 2005). In 2001 Deiro's son donated the Guido Deiro Archives to The Center for the Study of Free-Reed Instruments at the Graduate Center of the City University of New York.
