= Whitney Cross =

American historian

Whitney Rogers Cross (1913–1955), was a mid-20th-century historian, best known as the author of The Burned-over District: The Social and Intellectual History of Enthusiastic Religion in Western New York, 1800 – 1850 (Cornell University Press, 1950).

== Biography ==
Cross was born in Rochester, New York in 1913. After completing an M.A. in history at the University of Rochester, he taught high school in Painted Post, New York from 1936 to 1939, when he left to enter a graduate program at Harvard University. Cross's teachers at Harvard included Perry Miller, widely considered to be one of the inventors of the sub-discipline now commonly referred to as intellectual history; Frederick Merk, a social historian influenced by the “frontier hypothesis” of Frederick Jackson Turner; and Arthur M. Schlesinger Sr., whose pioneering work in both social history and women's history shaped a generation of scholars. While working on his dissertation with Schlesinger, Cross served as the first head of the Local and Regional History Collection at Cornell University. After completing his degree in 1945, he held teaching positions at Connecticut College for Women, at Smith College, and at West Virginia University. He died in 1955.

== The Burned-over District ==
The Burned-over District asserts that during the first half of the nineteenth century, the inhabitants of the western third of New York State showed themselves to be atypically willing to give themselves over to various “isms,” including revivalism, Mormonism, Millerism, spiritualism, AntiMasonic agitation, abolitionism, feminism, and experiments in communal living. Whether this area was in fact unusually hospitable to revivalism and social reform movements is now considered to be open to question. However, Cross's methodology and the contours of his argument struck his readers as innovative and worthy of imitation. Cross used materials commonly associated with local or regional history such as demographic data, commercial records, and eyewitness accounts from relatively obscure individuals, to argue that the social environment constructed in this region and era made the inhabitants more willing and likelier than most Americans during this period to pursue both their own improvement and the improvement of society as a whole. The book was reprinted in paperback as recently as 2006.
