= New Vrindaban =

ISKCON New Vrindaban
- Unincorporated area
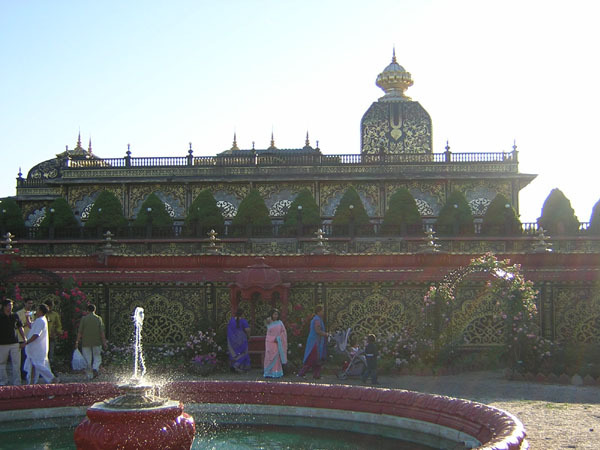
- The Palace of Gold

- Location within the state of West Virginia ISKCON New Vrindaban (the United States)
- Coordinates: 39°57′53″N 80°36′23″W
- Country: United States
- State: West Virginia
- County: Marshall

Area
  - Total: 1.9 sq mi (4.8 km^{2})
  - Land: 1.8 sq mi (4.7 km^{2})
  - Water: 0.039 sq mi (0.1 km^{2})
- Elevation: 1,175 ft (358 m)

Population (2010)
  - Total: 352
  - Density: 190/sq mi (75/km^{2})
- Time zone: UTC-5 (Eastern (EST))
  - Summer (DST): UTC-4 (EDT)
- ZIP codes: 26041
- Area code: 304/681
- GNIS feature ID: 1717344
- Prabhupada's Palace of Gold
- U.S. National Register of Historic Places
- Location: Near Moundsville, West Virginia
- Area: 50.1 acres (20.3 ha)
- Built: 1973-1985
- NRHP reference No.: 100002852
- Added to NRHP: August 28, 2019

New Vrindaban is an unincorporated area and an ISKCON (Hare Krishna) intentional community located in Marshall County, West Virginia, United States, near Moundsville. The town consists of 1,204 acres (4.87 km^{2}) (0.1 km² of which is water), and several building complexes, homes, apartment buildings, and businesses including the Sri Sri Radha Vrindaban Chandra Temple (RVC Temple) and Prabhupada's Palace of Gold. New Vrindaban was founded in 1968 under the direct guidance of A.C. Bhaktivedanta Swami Prabhupada, founder of ISKCON, by his disciple Kirtanananda Swami. It is named after the Indian city of Vrindavan.

It is one of many "rural communities" set up by ISKCON followers across the world.

== Geography ==
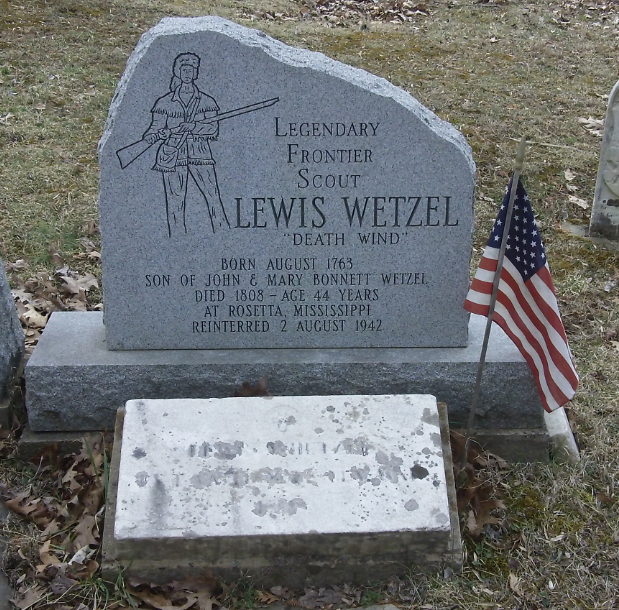
Lewis Wetzel resting place in McCreary Cemetery

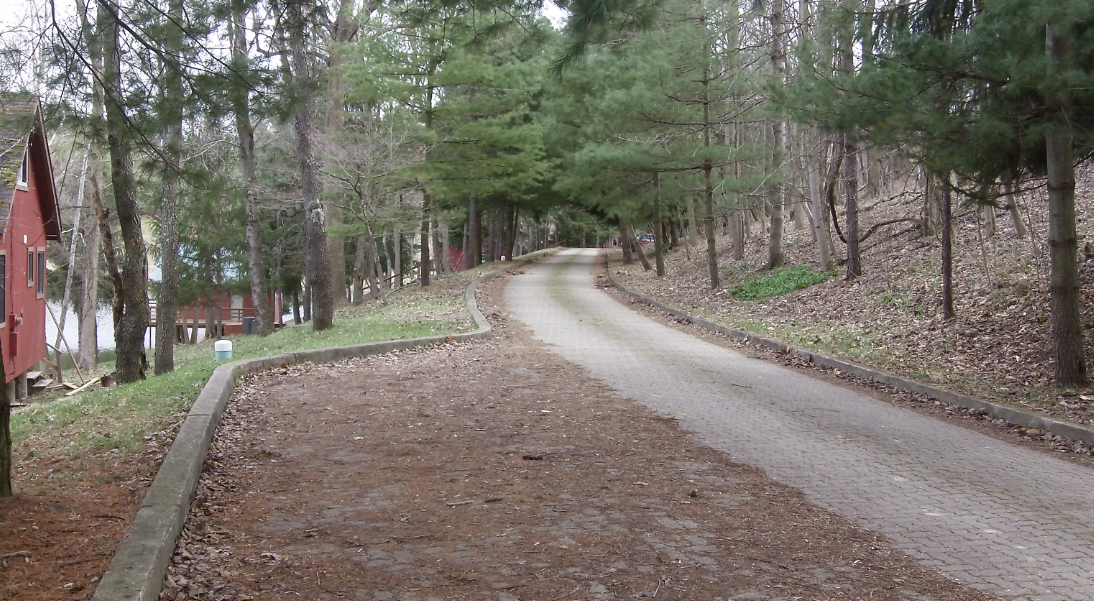
Oxen Road

According to the 2010 US Census, the six census blocks that make up New Vrindaban had a population of 352 and had the West Virginia status of unincorporated town. It is bordered on the north and northwest by Big Wheeling Creek, on the East by Stull Run, and on the southwest by the village of Limestone. The town's water and sewage utilities are provided by the New Vrindaban Public Service District, and following the Marshall County Commission's road naming project all streets in New Vrindaban have been fully named. In addition to ISKCON, the town is the location of McCreary Cemetery, resting place of West Virginia pioneer Lewis Wetzel; various locally owned businesses; and other ISKCON-affiliated organizations. The chief components in New Vrindaban's economy are tourism, agriculture, and cottage industries as well as income from fracking on the community's land.

The religious organization ISKCON New Vrindaban is the largest holder of land in New Vrindaban with 38% of the land. The nonprofit organization ECO-Vrindaban, Inc. holds 14%, and all other organizations and individuals own 48% of the land encompassing New Vrindaban. In addition to the previously mentioned organizations, as of 2010 jewellery manufacturer Lone Ones Inc., organic commercial bakery World's Best Cookie, Vaishnava Performing Arts Inc., and Vedic Heritage Trust Inc. had facilities in New Vrindaban.

== History ==
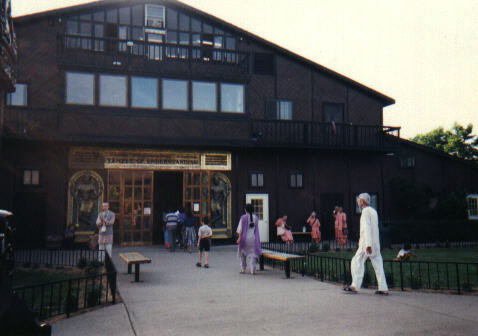
Sri Sri Radha Vrindavan Chandra Temple, at Temple of Understanding Circle Drive, July 1997.

The community was founded in 1968 by Kirtanananda Swami and Hayagriva Das, two early disciples of A. C. Bhaktivedanta Swami Prabhupada. New Vrindaban developed under the guidance of Kirtanananda Swami (honored as "Srila Bhaktipada" after March 1979), and by the mid-1970s the live-in population had grown to over 100. By the 1980s the population was more than 500.

According to ISKCON News, on July 4, 1983 Vedavyasa Priya Swami installed the statue of Sri Nathji at the RVC Temple. Conversely, according to Gargarishi Das, the deity was not installed by Vedavyasa Priya, but was installed instead by Kirtanananda Swami.

In October, 1986, a census report showed 377 adults living at the community.

On March 16, 1987, during their annual meeting at Mayapur, India, the ISKCON Governing Body Commission expelled Kirtanananda from the society for "moral and theological deviations." The community of New Vrindaban was expelled from ISKCON a year later. After Kirtanananda Swami left New Vrindaban, and new leadership stabilized, the community was readmitted to ISKCON in 1998.

== Culture ==
New Vrindaban is named for the Indian city of Vrindavan.

=== Cuisine ===
New Vrindaban is strictly vegetarian and believes that meat consumption creates negative karma. Alcoholic beverages and illegal substances (such as drugs) are prohibited in the main holy sites around the Temple of Understanding Circle Drive.

=== Popular culture ===
A structure known as the Palace of the Winding Path, based on the Palace of Gold, is featured in the 2018 video game Fallout 76, though in-game it was never associated with the Hare Krishna movement either before or after the atomic war.

== Prabhupada's Palace of Gold ==
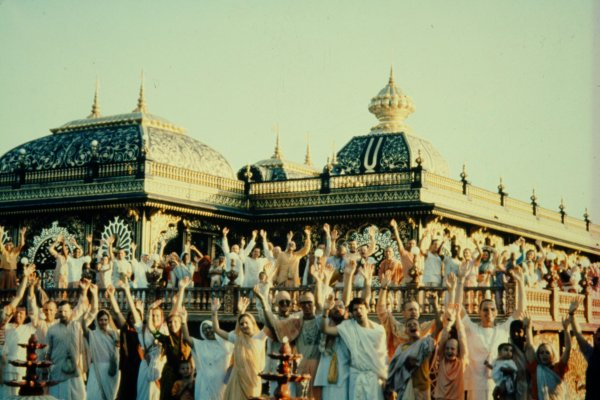
Prabhupada's Palace of Gold and Hare Krishna devotees, c. 1982.

Originally intended in 1972 to be a residence for A. C. Bhaktivedanta Swami Prabhupada, the founder-acharya of the International Society for Krishna Consciousness (ISKCON), the plans evolved after Prabhupada's death in November 1977 for an ornate palace of marble, gold and carved teakwood, which was dedicated as a memorial shrine on September 2, 1979. Kirtanananda Swami, the leader of the New Vrindaban community, and Bhagavatananda Das, the community's principal architect and sculptor, were the two primary forces behind its design and construction.

It reportedly cost $600,000 in materials, and the labor was donated by the devotees. The unpaid workers were often untrained and learned on the job. Kirtanananda Swami explained, "In the beginning, we didn't even know how to lay blocks. As our Krishna consciousness developed, our building skills developed, then our creativity developed, and the scope of the project developed."

Prabhupada's Palace of Gold opened in 1979. CBS PM Magazine reported, "the magnificence of the Palace of Gold would be hard to exaggerate." Life magazine called the Palace "a place where tourists can come and be amazed." The New York Times proclaimed "Welcome to Heaven." The Washington Post called the palace "Almost Heaven." The Courier-Journal of Louisville stated, "It's hard to believe that Prabhupada's Palace is in West Virginia. In fact, it's hard to believe it's on this planet."

Beginning in the early 1990s, a lack of sufficient financial resources caused palace maintenance to be neglected; nevertheless, as of 2008, 50,000 tourists and Hindu pilgrims reportedly continued to visit each year. In 2011, a five-year, $4.27-million restoration effort started to restore and renew the palace.

== Gallery 1997–2007 ==
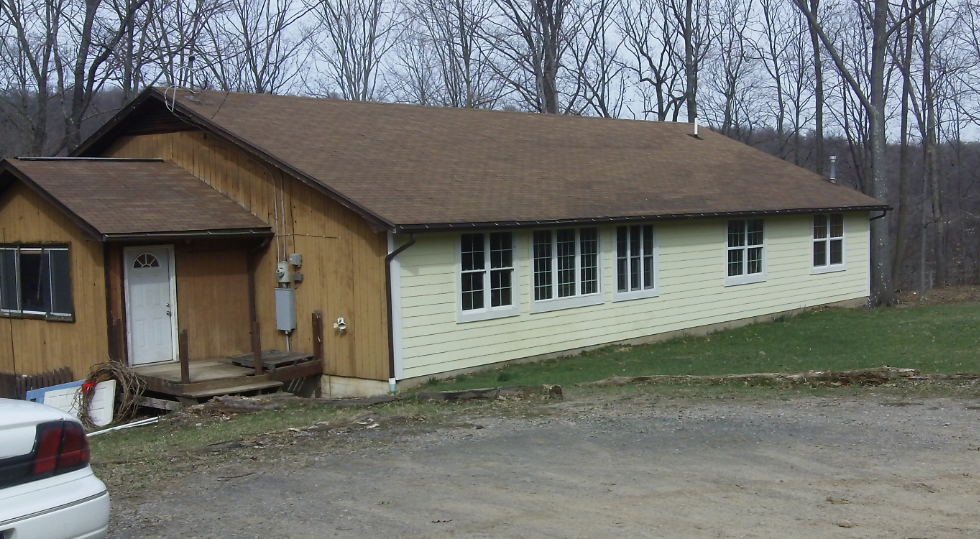
Nandagram School (New Building) Stull Run Road, New Vrindaban, WV, US

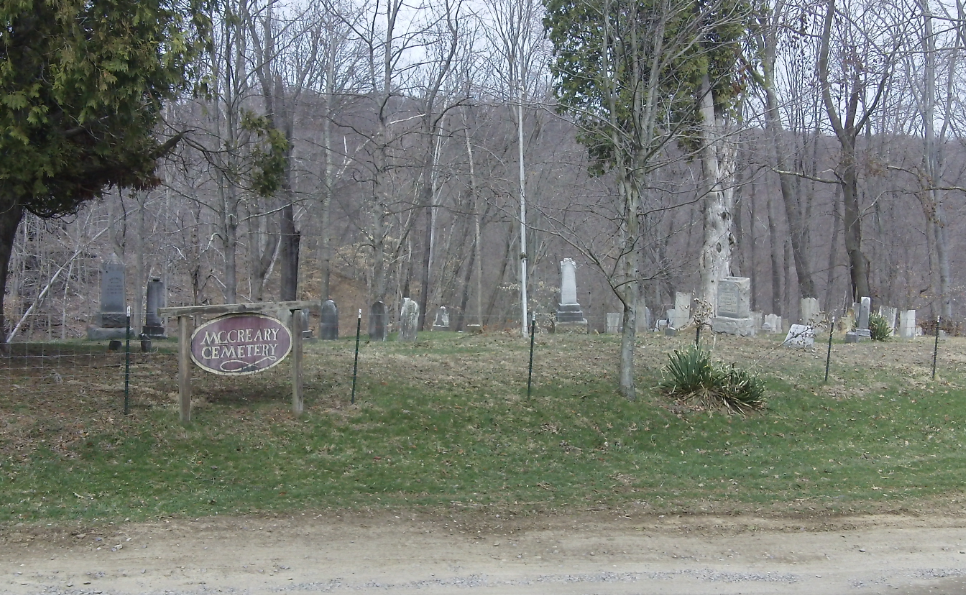
McCreary Cemetery, New Vrindaban, WV, US

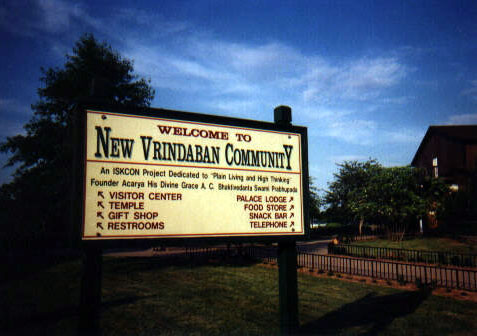
Picture of New Vrindaban Community sign in July 1997.

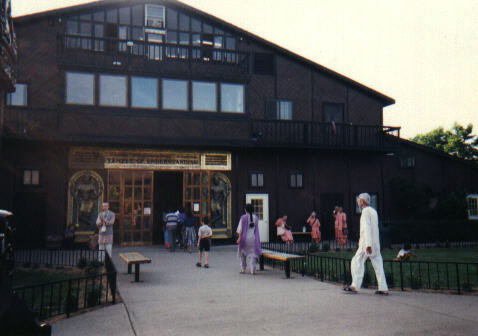
Sri Sri Radha Vrindavan Chandra Temple in July 1997.

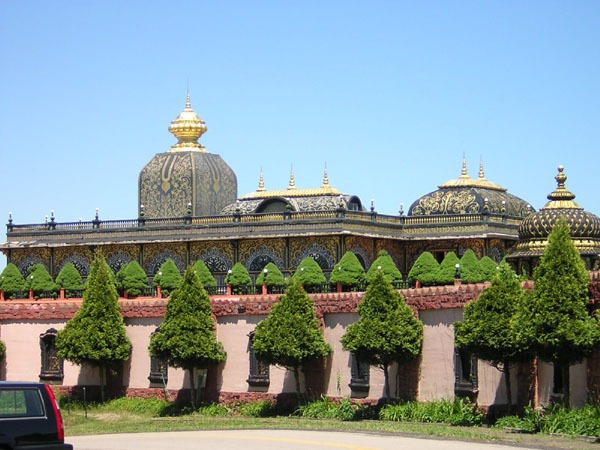
Prabhupada's Palace of Gold in June 2007.

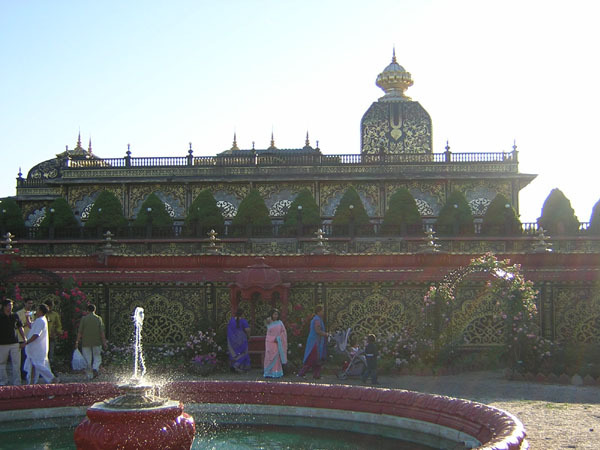
A side view of Prabhupada's Palace of Gold in June 2007.

Statues of Chaitanya Mahaprabhu and Nityananda (Sri Sri Gaura Nitai) in June 2007.

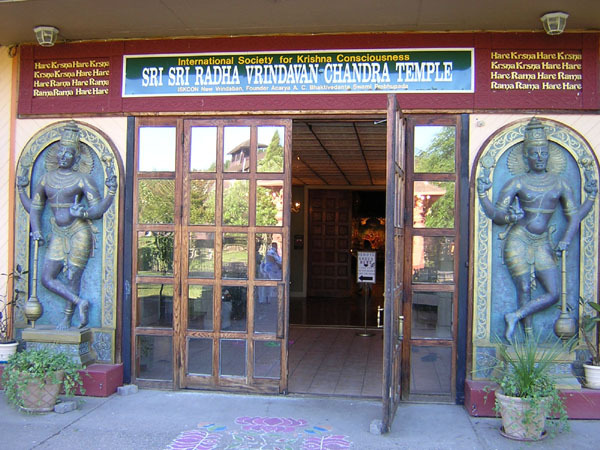
Entrance of Sri Sri Radha Vrindavan Chandra Temple in June 2007.

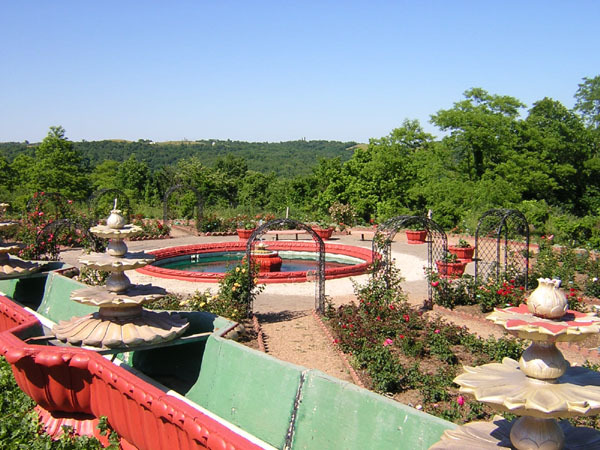
The rose garden in June 2007.

Statue of A. C. Bhaktivedanta Swami Prabhupada in July 1997.
