= ISKCON Temple =

ISKCON Temple may refer to one of the several temples established by the International Society for Krishna Consciousness (ISKCON) in various cities around the world. Some of the prominent ISKCON Temples around the world are:

- Bhaktivedanta Manor in Hertfordshire, Watford, UK
- ISKCON Krishna House in Columbus, Ohio, USA
- ISKCON Temple, Bengaluru in Bengaluru, Karnataka, India
- ISKCON Temple, Chennai in Chennai, Tamil Nadu, India
- ISKCON Temple, Delhi in New Delhi, Delhi, India
- ISKCON Temple, Leicester in Leicester, Leicestershire, UK
- ISKCON Temple, Patna in Patna, Bihar, India
- ISKCON Temple, Pune in Pune, Maharashtra, India
- ISKCON Temple, Vrindavan in Vrindavan, Uttar Pradesh, India
- Temple of the Vedic Planetarium in Mayapur, West Bengal, India
