= ISKCON Temple, Patna =

ISKCON Patna
- Sri Sri Radha Banke Bihari Temple
- Location within Patna

Religion
- Affiliation: Hinduism
- Deity: Radha Krishna (Krishna and Radha)

Location
- Location: Buddha Marg, Patna - 800001
- State: Bihar
- Country: India
- Coordinates: 25°36′29″N 85°8′4″E

Architecture
- Type: Contemporary North Indian temple architecture
- Creator: International Society for Krishna Consciousness
- Established: 2022
- Groundbreaking: 2007
- Completed: 2023

Website
- iskconpatna.com

Sri Sri Radha Banke Bihari Temple (Hindi: श्री श्री राधा बाँके बिहारी मंदिर), popularly known as ISKCON Patna, is a Hindu temple of the International Society for Krishna Consciousness (ISKCON) located on Budh Marg in Patna, Bihar, India. It is the first ISKCON temple in Bihar and the largest Hindu temple in Patna by campus area. It has been reported to be the fourth-largest ISKCON temple in India. The temple complex was developed in phases between 2010 and 2023, with the temple inaugurated on 3 May 2022. It is known for hosting Patna's annual Jagannath Ratha Yatra and other Vaishnavite festivals.

== History ==
The foundation stone for the temple was laid in April 2007 by the then Chief Minister of Bihar, Nitish Kumar. Construction commenced in 2010 and the project, undertaken at a reported cost of approximately ₹100 crore, was developed in phases over more than a decade. The first phase, comprising the main temple and facilities for daily worship, was inaugurated on 3 May 2022, coinciding with Akshaya Tritiya, by Nitish Kumar and the Governor of Bihar, Phagu Chauhan, following the Prana pratishtha (consecration) of the deities. The remaining portions of the temple complex were completed in 2023.

== Construction ==
The temple was constructed primarily using Makrana marble and other traditional building materials. Contemporary reports noted the participation of artisans from different communities in its construction. The project took around fifteen years to complete.

== Architecture ==
The temple is approximately 108 feet (33 m) high and occupies about two acres. It is a four-storey structure comprising a central prayer hall, auditorium, guest accommodation, library, restaurant, classrooms, administrative offices and multipurpose halls. The temple features a contemporary structural design that blends modern institutional architecture with traditional North Indian temple elements. It is supported by 84 stone pillars.

== Deities ==
The presiding deities are Sri Sri Radha Banke Bihari. The temple also houses shrines dedicated to Sri Sri Gaur Nitai and Sri Ram, Sita, Lakshman and Hanuman.

== Festivals ==
The temple celebrates major Vaishnavite festivals throughout the year, including:

- Krishna Janmashtami
- Gaura Purnima
- Govardhan Puja
- Jagannath Ratha Yatra

== Rath Yatra ==
ISKCON Patna organises the annual Jagannath Ratha Yatra in Patna. The procession begins from the temple premises on Budh Marg and passes through several parts of the city before returning to the temple. The event attracts lakhs of devotees annually.

== See also ==
- International Society for Krishna Consciousness
- Bhagavad Gita
- Ratha Yatra (Puri)
- Religion in Bihar
