= Bhandirvan, Vrindavan =

Religious site in Uttar Pradesh, India

Bhandirvan Bhandirban
- Village
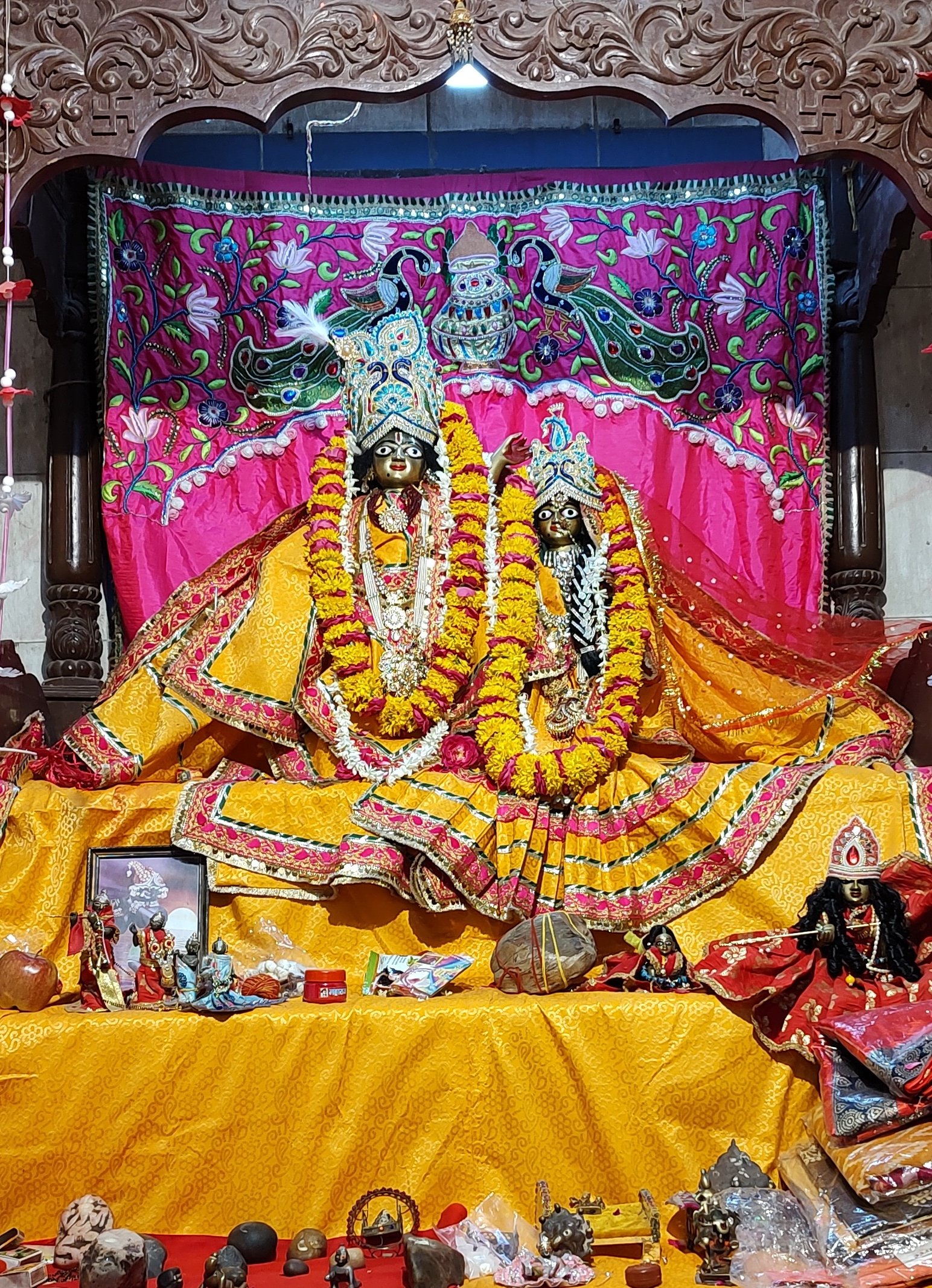
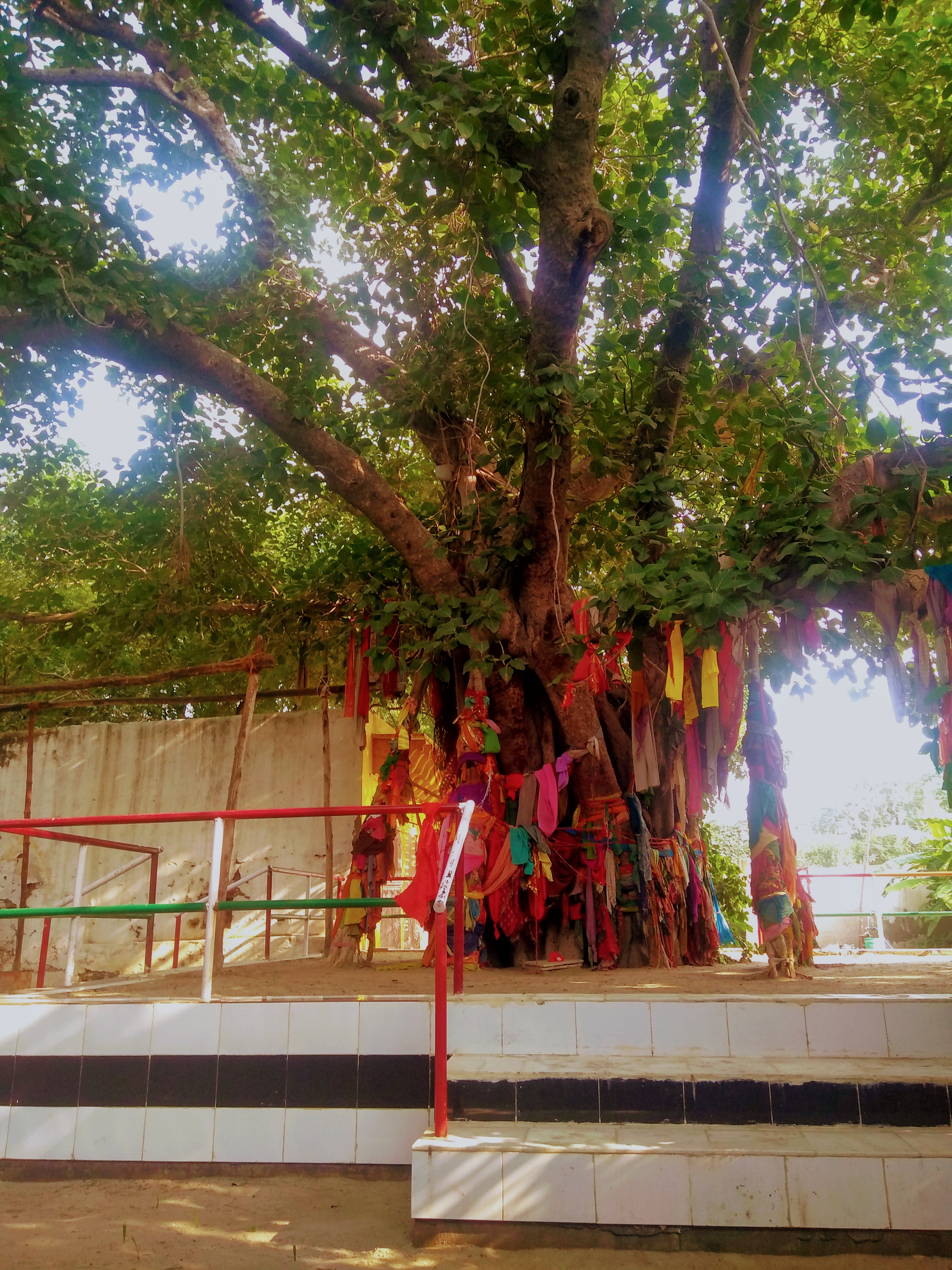
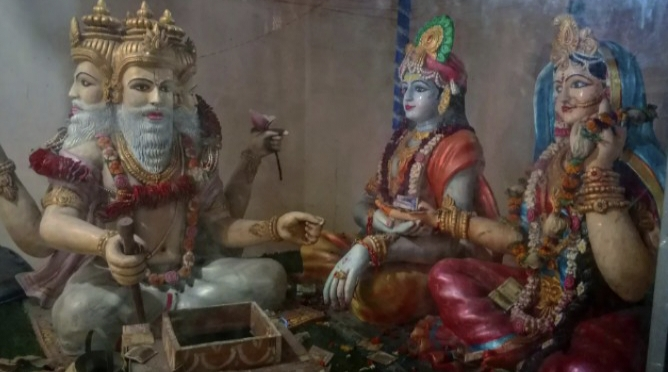
- Clockwise from top: Radha Bhandir Bihari temple, Vanshivat tree, Radha Krishna Vivah Sthali temple
- Nicknames: Radha Krishna Vivah Sthali
- Location in Uttar Pradesh, India Bhandirvan (India)
- Coordinates: 27.65594°N 77.70737°E

Government
  - Type: Gram Panchayat
  - Body: Mant Gram Panchayat
- Elevation: 189 m (620 ft)
- Demonym: Braj wasi

Languages
  - Official: Hindi, Braj Bhasha
- Time zone: UTC+05:30 (IST)
- PIN: 281202
- Telephone code: 0565

Bhandirvan is an ancient religious site in Mant Tehsil of Mathura district, Uttar Pradesh, India. The site is associated with the legends of Hindu god Krishna and goddess Radha.

== Transport ==
Bhandirvan forest is situated in Mathura district which is about 30 kilometres away from Mathura city and 10 kilometres away from Vrindavan city. Private vehicles are available from Vrindavan to visit Bhandirvan.

== Main attraction ==
Bhandirvan is very popular among Radha Krishna devotees. It is known for religious sites Radha Krishna Vivah Sthali where marriage of Radha Krishna was performed by god Brahma and Vanshivat which is associated with the legend of Krishna playing flute to call Radha and Gopis to perform Maharaas.

== See also ==
- Barsana
- Gokul
- Nandgaon
