= Radha Krishna Vivah Sthali, Bhandirvan =

Place of Radha Krishna's marriage

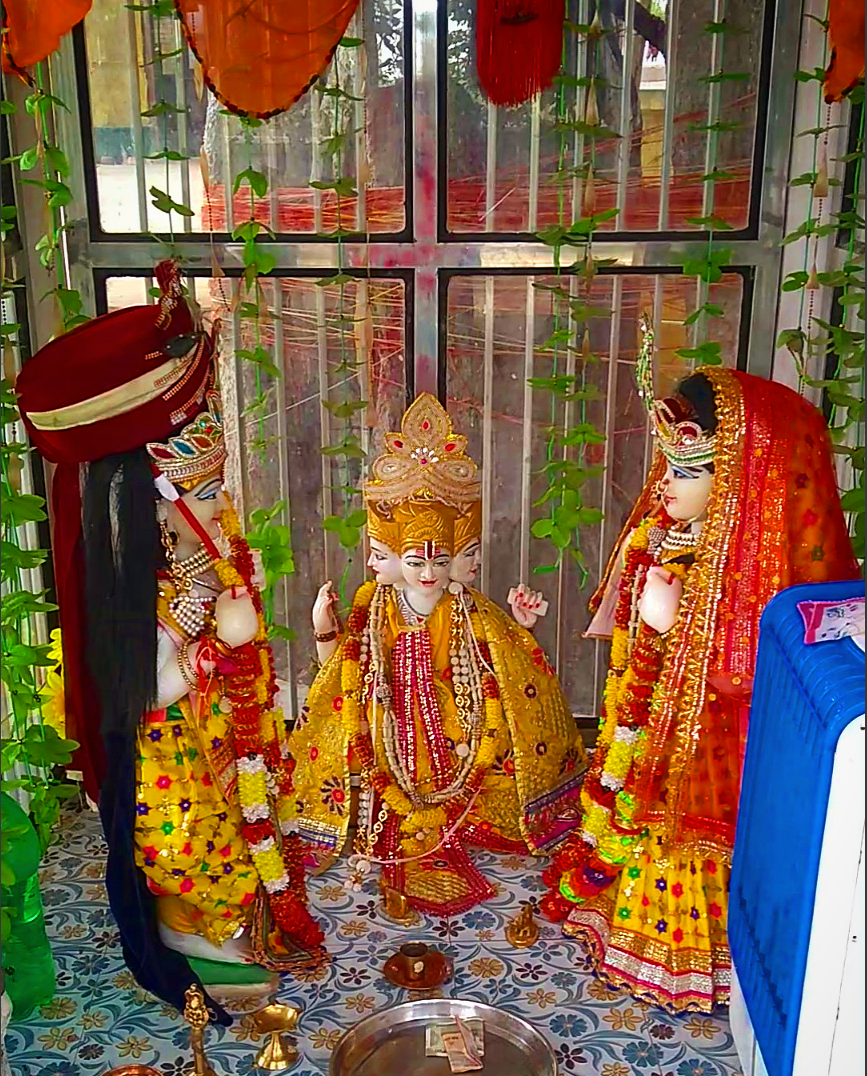
- Marriage ceremony of Radha and Krishna performed by Brahma

- Location in Uttar Pradesh

Religion
- Affiliation: Hinduism
- District: Mathura
- Deity: Radha Krishna
- Festivals: Phulera dooj, Radhashtami, Janmashtami, Sharad Purnima, Lathmar Holi

Location
- Location: Bhandirvan, Vrindavan
- State: Uttar Pradesh
- Country: India
- Coordinates: 27.65594°N 77.70737°E

Radha Krishna Vivah Sthali, is a Hindu temple, dedicated to Radha and Krishna. The temple site is present in the Bhandirvan forest of Mant constituency in Mathura district, Uttar Pradesh, India. The site holds cultural importance as according to Sanskrit scriptures - Braham Vaivarta Purana and Garga Samhita, Radha and Krishna were married in Bhandirvan forest in the presence of Brahma, the creator, who also became the priest and solemnized their wedding ceremony. Annually, this divine wedding is celebrated on the occasion of Phulera Dooj which usually falls in the month of February - March.

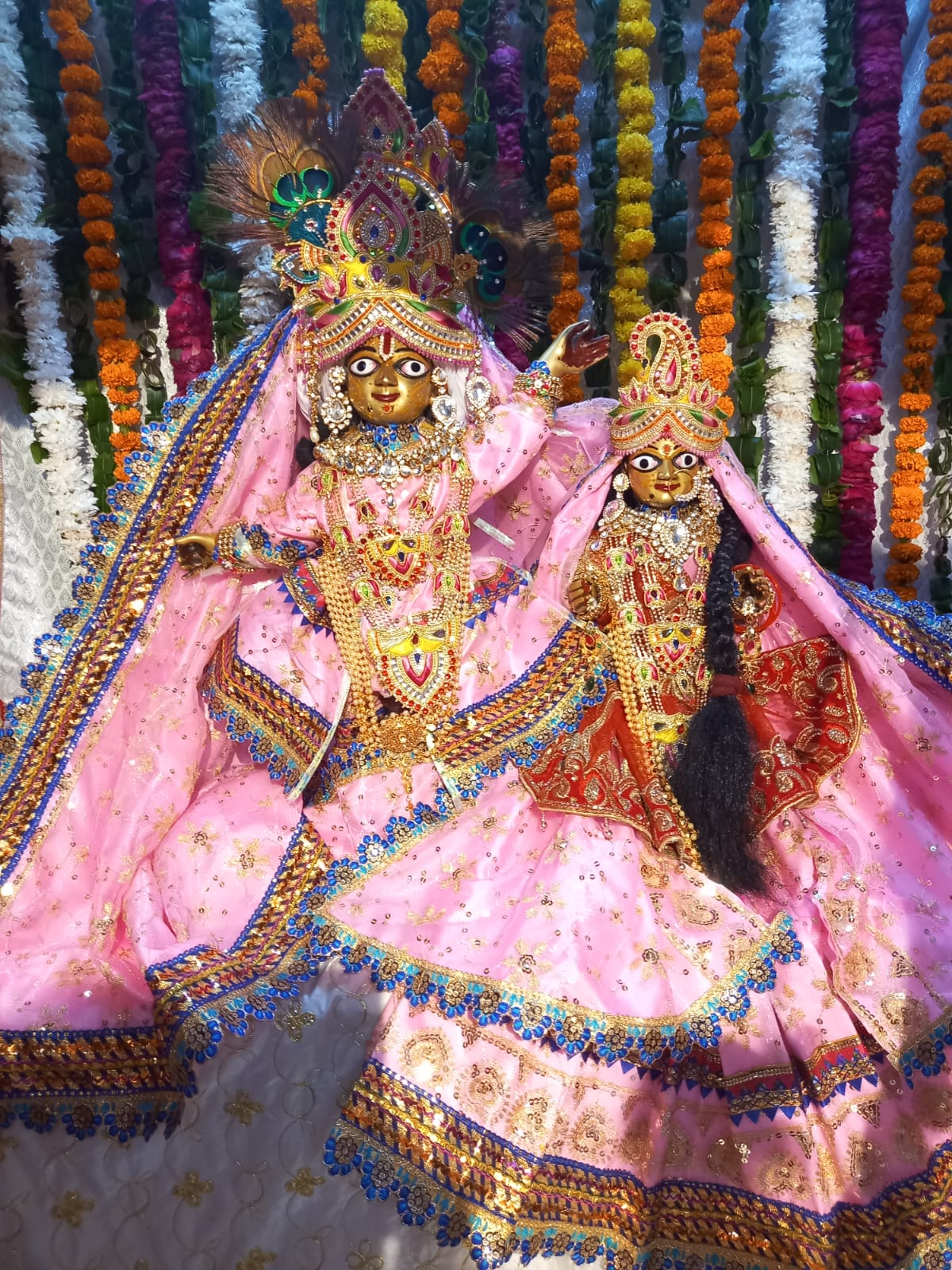
As marriage ritual, Krishna putting Sindoor on Radha's head in Radha Bhandir Bihari Temple, Bhandirvan

Bhandirvan is listed as one of the sacred forests of Braj region. Inside the premises of Bhandirvan, there is Radha Bhandir Bihari temple where Krishna is seen putting the sindoor on Radha's head which symbolises a significant marriage ritual in Hindu wedding ceremony. Near this temple, there is Venu Kup, a sacred well which was believed to be created by Krishna himself with his flute. There is also a pair of huge banyan trees beneath which Radha and Krishna's marriage ceremony took place. A temple dedicated to Balarama is also present inside the temple premises.

== History ==
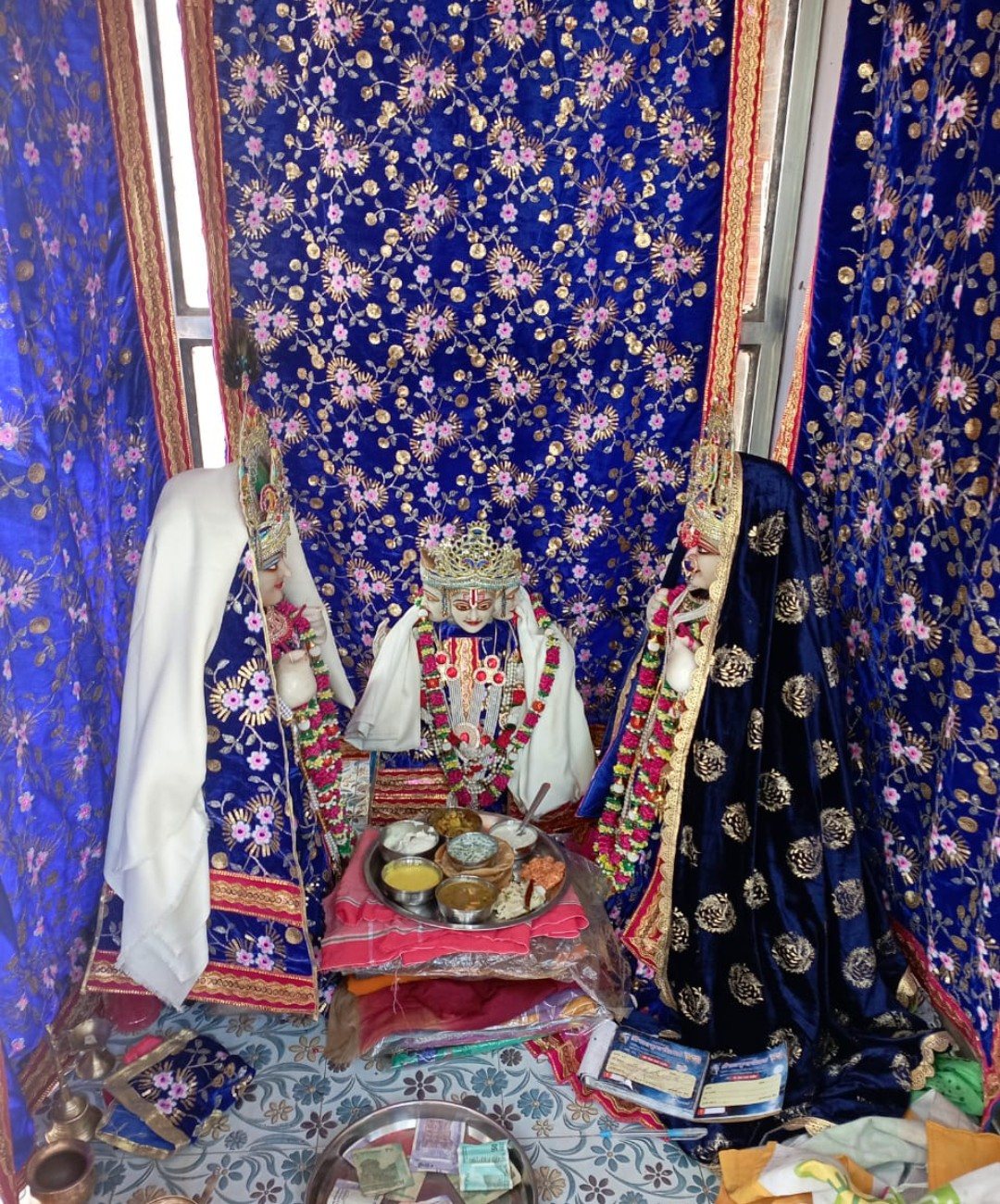
Brahma (centre) as priest performing the marriage rituals of Radha (right) and Krishna (left) at Radha Krishna Vivah Sthali temple, Bhandirvan

Bhandirvan is one of the most prominent forest among the forests of Vrindavan. It is celebrated as the forest of Braj where Krishna used to enjoy taking lunch with his cowherd friends under the massive Bhandirvata banyan tree. Bhandirvan has many legends associated with it. Some of the major leelas (events) linked with Bhandirvan are :-

=== Radha Krishna Vivah Leela ===
Bhandirvan has witnessed the divine marriage ceremony of Radha and Krishna. The wedding ceremony took place in the presence of Brahma who also acted as the priest. This unison of Radha and Krishna happened in the absence of society. The locals say that only 10 million confidential associates of the couple (that included sakhis, peacocks, parrots, cows, and monkeys) participated in this marriage. To give more importance to "Parakiya rasa" (love without any social foundation) over "Svakiya rasa" (married relationship), this marriage was kept hidden. According to scriptures like Brahma Vaivarta Purana and Garga Samhita, the story mentioned is as follows :-

"One day, Nanda Baba went along with infant Krishna to Bhandirvan for cow grazing. When Nanda sat under a tree to rest, a ferocious storm started blowing and the environment became dark. Nanda was afraid for the safety of his son. Krishna also acted as if he was frightened and hugged Nanda with fear. But then, Nanda saw the beautiful gopi, Radha approaching him from the storm in her divine form. She was glowing with beauty. Realizing that it was a play, Nanda gave the infant to Radha and said that he knows that she is very dear to Krishna. He said that she can enjoy with Krishna and after that leave the infant back home to Yashoda. Radha was very happy to see the infant Krishna and kissed him. Suddenly, a palace appeared in front of her. The palace was shining with jewels and rubies. And then she saw the infant Krishna vanished from her lap while a young handsome man appeared before her wearing jewelry and a crown. She immediately realized it that it was the divine form of Krishna. Krishna praised Radha and acknowledged his deep love for her. He told Radha that she was the other half of him. But Radha shared her pain of separation with Krishna to which Krishna consoled her and asked her to wait as he would make her happy. At that moment, Brahma appeared in front of them and under his guidance performed their wedding ceremony by making the couple exchanged their garlands and chanting Vedic mantras sitting in front of the holy fire. This marriage ceremony was called Gandharva Vivah. Thereafter, Krishna and Radha spent time together in delightful pastimes. After some time, Krishna again returned to his infant form and promised Radha that they would keep returning to Bhandirvan for their lovable pastimes. Thereafter, Radha took the infant Krishna back to his mother Yashoda".

=== Killing the demon Pralamba ===
The site is also famous for leela associated with Balrama and Pralamba. Pralamba was a strong and powerful demon sent by Mathura's tyrant king Kansa to kill Krishna and Balarama. It was at Bhandirvan where Pralamba was killed by Balarama. The story goes like this -

"Once, a great demon named Pralamba entered the playgroup of gopas (cowherds) disguised as a boy, with the intention to kill both Balarama and Krishna. But Krishna, who was already aware of this, began to think about how to kill the demon. However, externally he received him as a friend. According to the game rules, the defeated members in duel fighting games had to carry the victorious members on their backs. When the party of Balarama, came out victorious, the boys in Krishna's party had to carry them on their backs through the Bhandirvan forest. Imitating others, Pralamba, who appeared there as a cowherd boy in Krishna's party, carried Balarama on his back. In order to avoid the company of Krishna, Pralamba carried Balarama far away. But soon the demon began to feel the heavy burden of Balarama, and not being able to withstand that, finally assumed his real form. At first, Balarama was surprised by the demon's appearance, but he quickly understood that he was being carried away a demon who wanted to kill him. Immediately, He struck the head of Pralamba with his strong fist, who fell down dead with a tremendous sound, as blood poured from his mouth".

=== Krishna Swallowed Forest Fire ===
Lord Krishna performed many leelas in Bhandirvan which also includes saving the cowherds and the calves from a colossal forest fire. According to legend, one day, Lord Krishna and his friends brought the cows to drink water at the river Yamuna and then let them graze freely. The boys became so absorbed in their games that they were unaware of their cows wandering off. The cows made their way to the Munjavan forest where they got lost and couldn't return. When Krishna's cowherds friends could not find the cows they also went to look for the cows in the forest without Krishna and Balrama. At this time, the servants of Kansa set the forest on fire, which spread everywhere in a moment and surrounded the cows and cowherd boys. Seeing no other way to save themselves they called out to Krishna, who arrived there in an instant and told his friends to close their eyes, Krishna swallowed the colossal forest-fire immediately saving the cows and his friends. The place where Shri Krishna swallowed the forest fire is called Munjatavi or Isikatavi.

=== Krishna Killed Demon Vatsasura ===
In Bhandirvan, Lord Krishna also performed the leela of killing the demon Vatsasura. Once, Lord Krishna and Balarama were playing on the bank of the Yamuna. At that time, the demon Vatsasura came there intending to kill them. Disguised as a calf, the demon mingled with the other calves. But Krishna, who already noticed this, immediately told Balarama about the demon's entry. Soon, both of them followed the demon. Krishna caught hold of two hind legs and tail of the demon-calf, whipped him around with great force and threw him to his death into a tree.

== Festivals ==
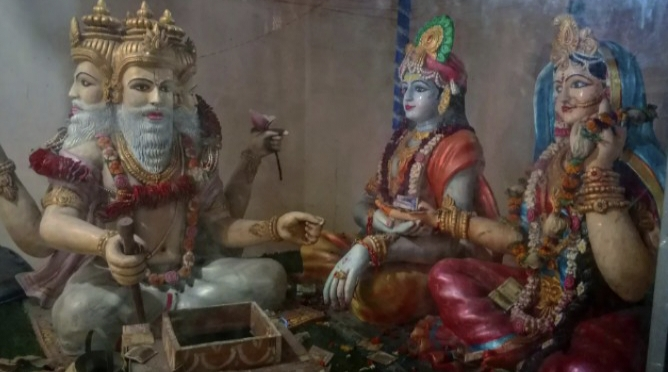
Radha Krishna's marriage is being performed by Brahma in Bhandirvan

The main festival of temple is called Byahula Utsav in which wedding ceremony of Radha and Krishna is performed annually by senior priests. According to Hindu calendar, the festival is celebrated on the occasion of Phulera dooj.

== Temple Gallery ==
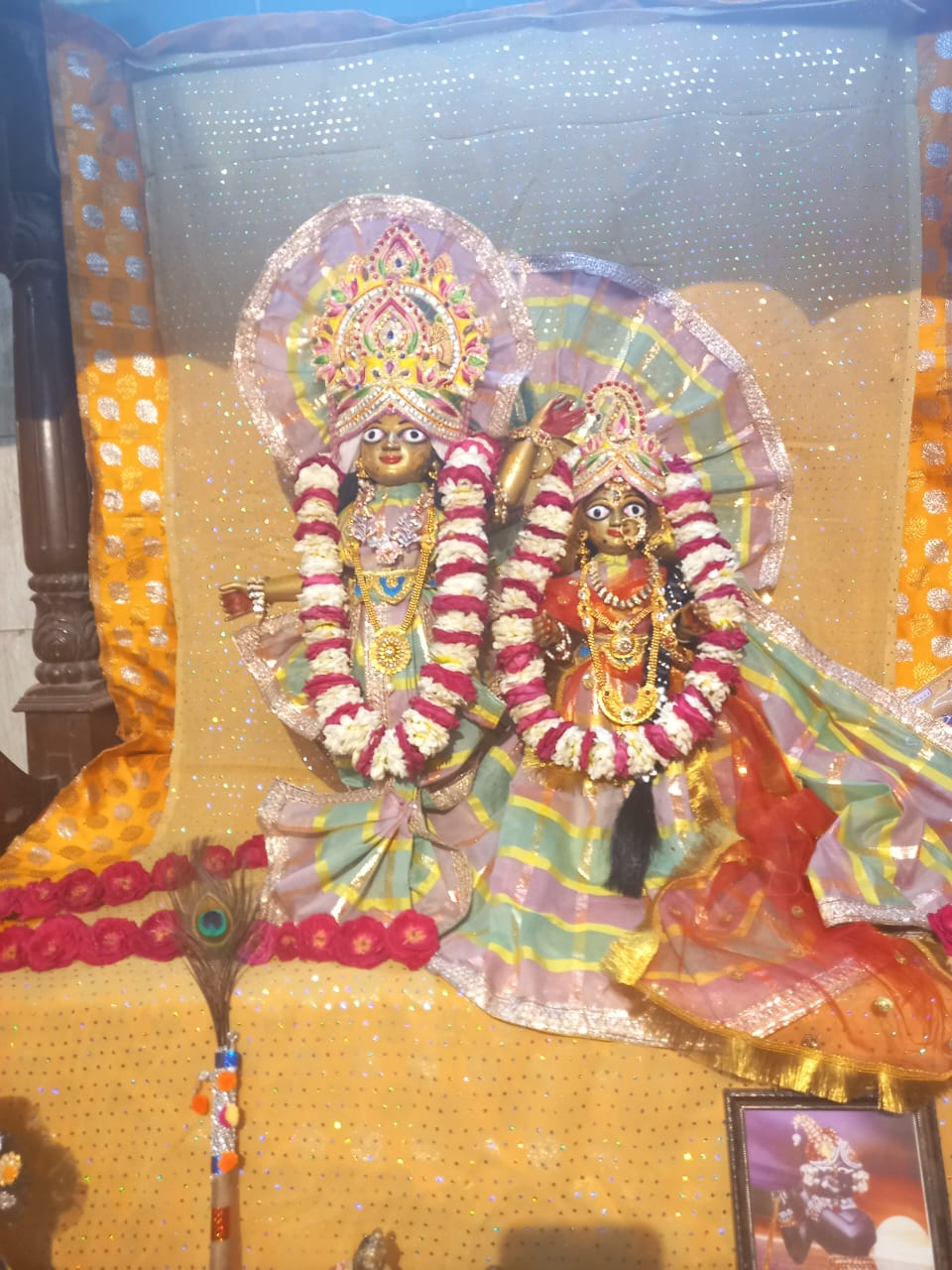
Radha Krishna in Bhandir Bihari Temple, Bhandirvan

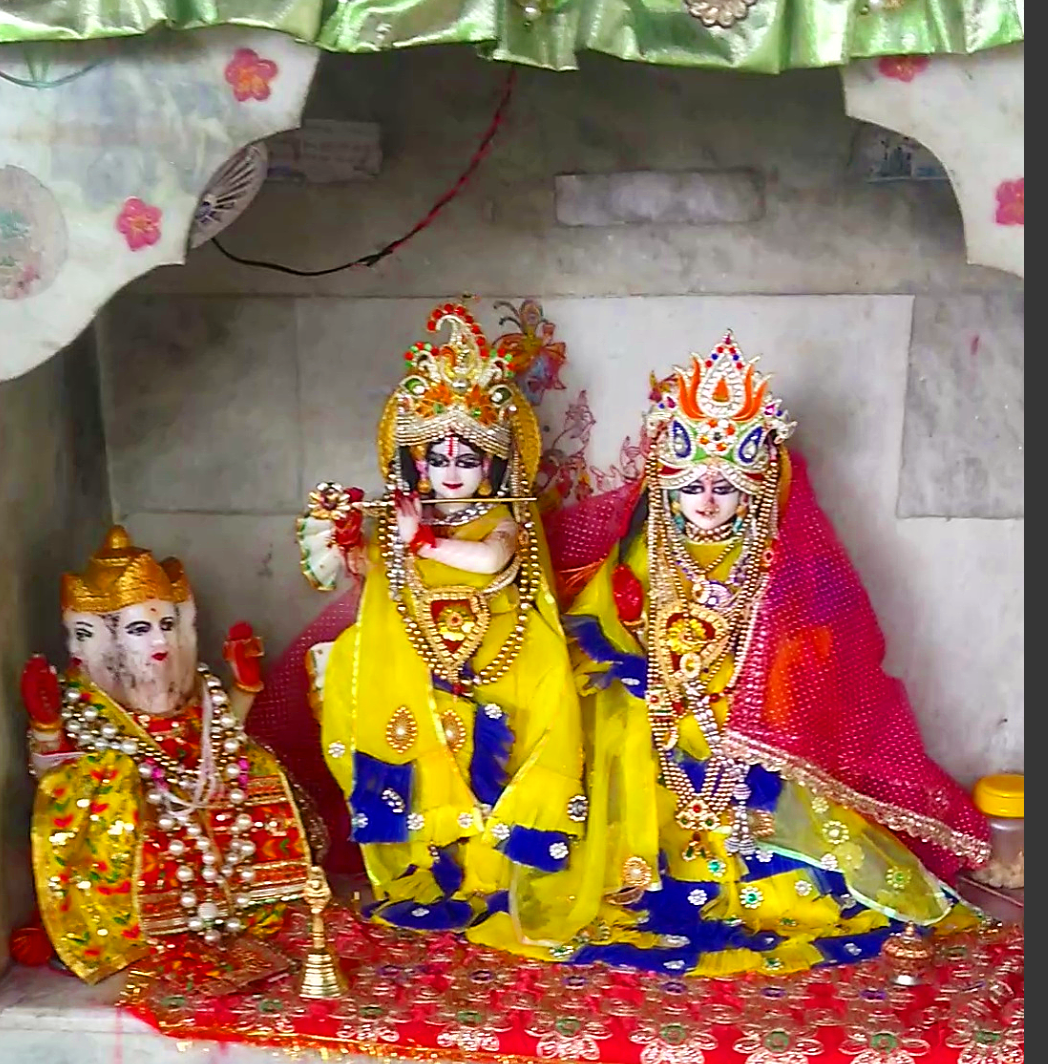
Radha Krishna temple beneath Bhandir Vat, Bhandirvan

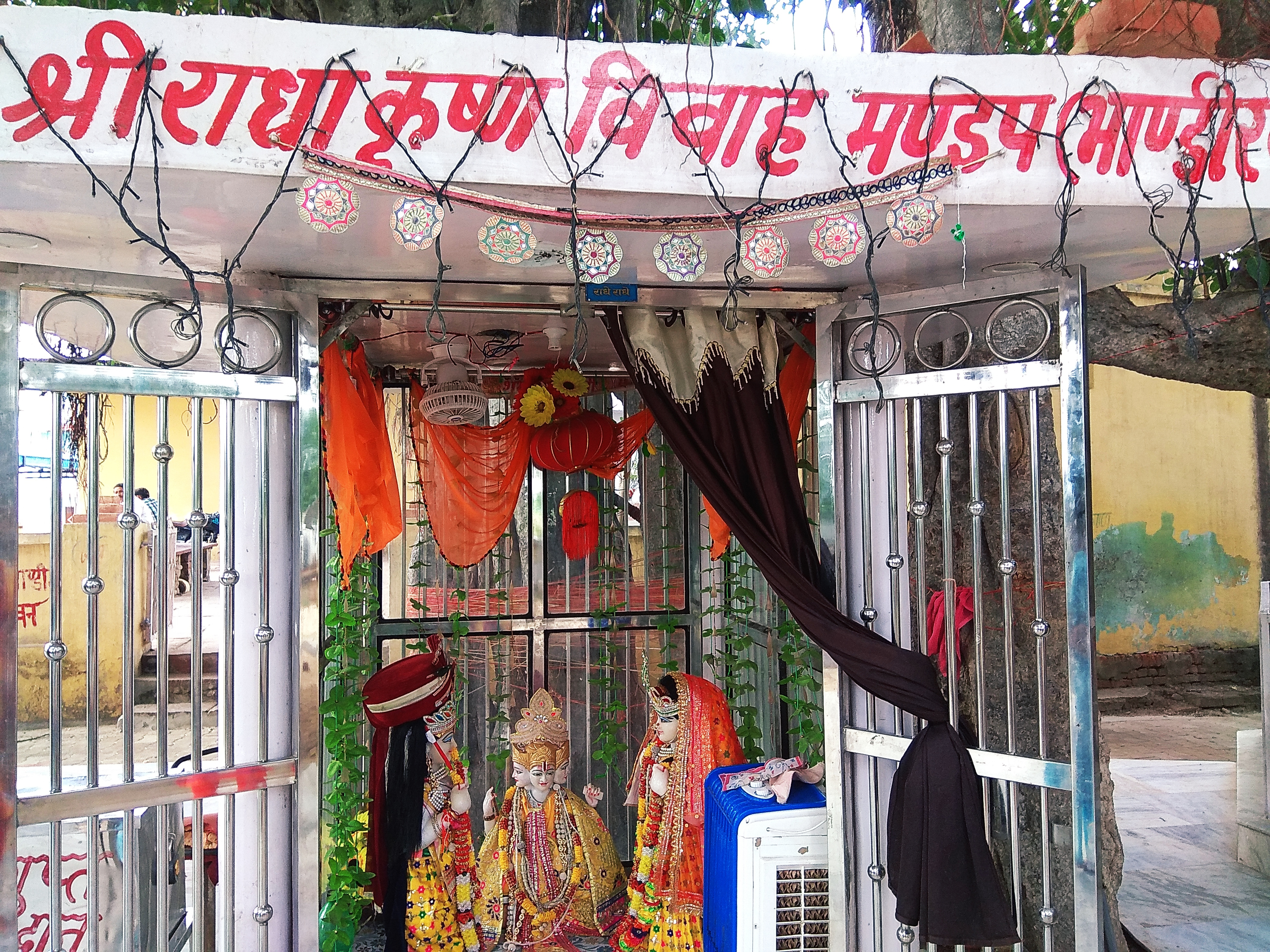
Radha Krishna Vivah Mandap in Bhandirvan

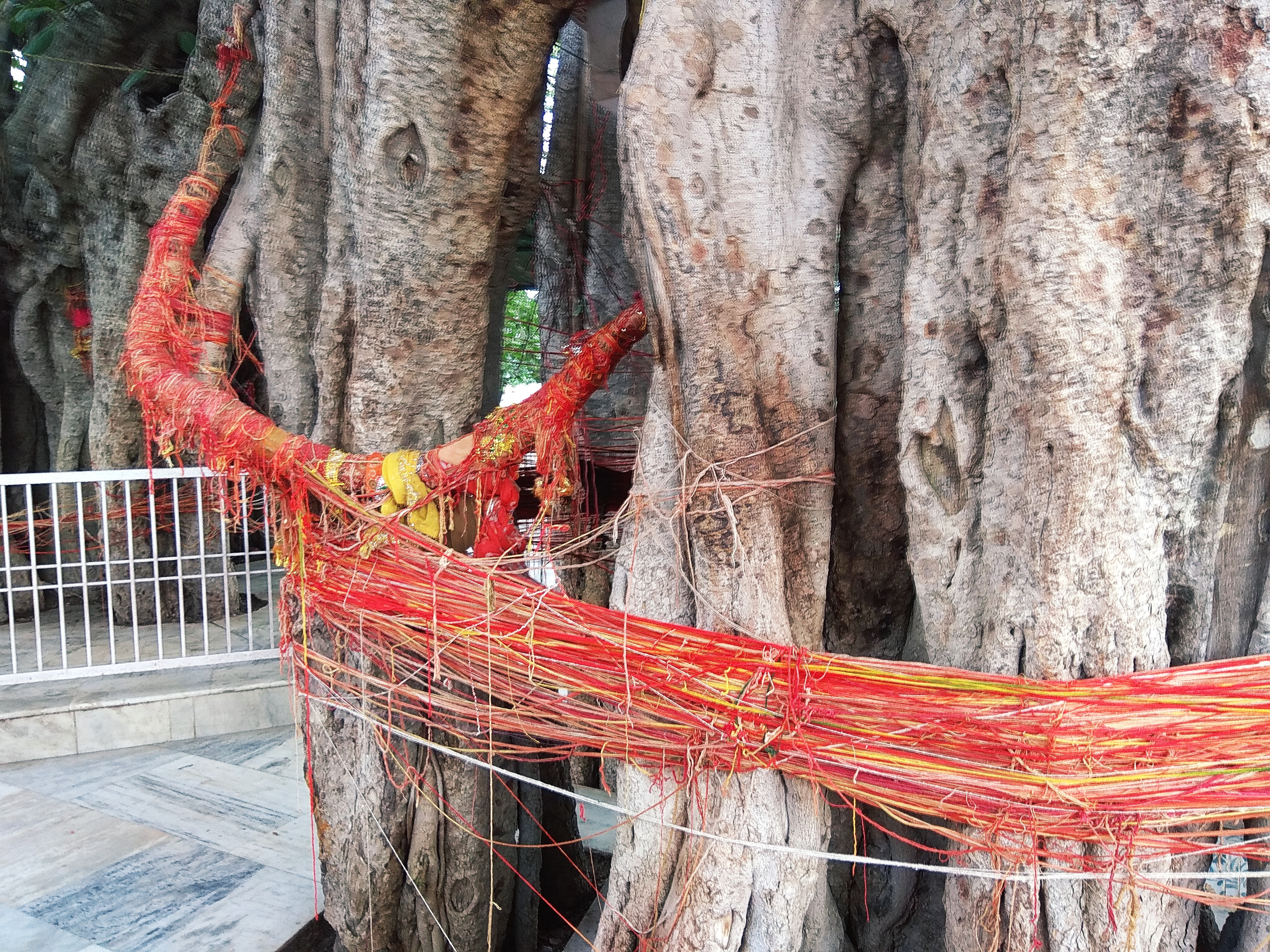
Bhandir Vat in Bhandirvan

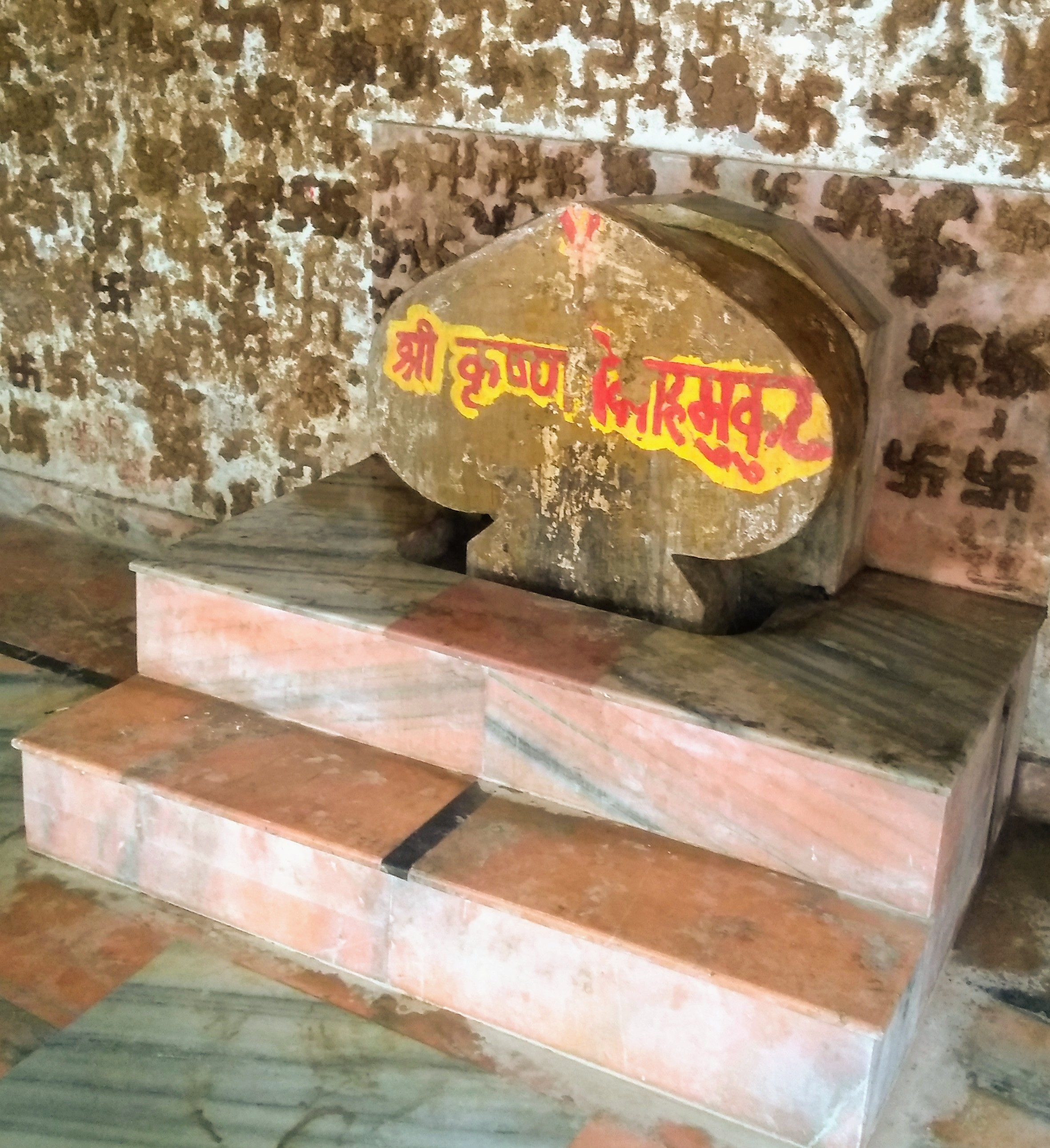
Krishna's Vivah Mukut placed near Venu Kup in Bhandirvan

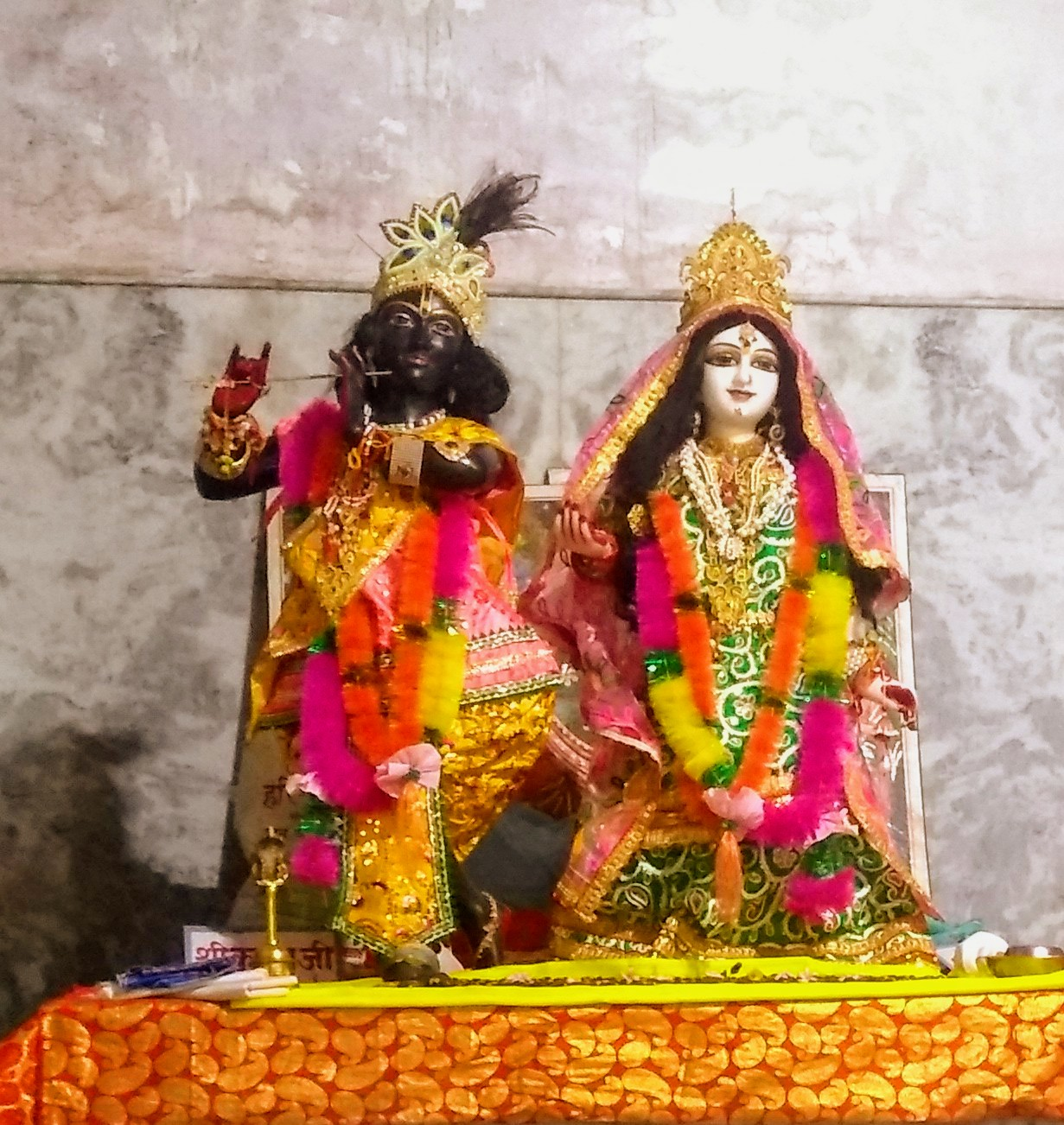
Radha Krishna temple in Vanshivat near Bhandirvan temple

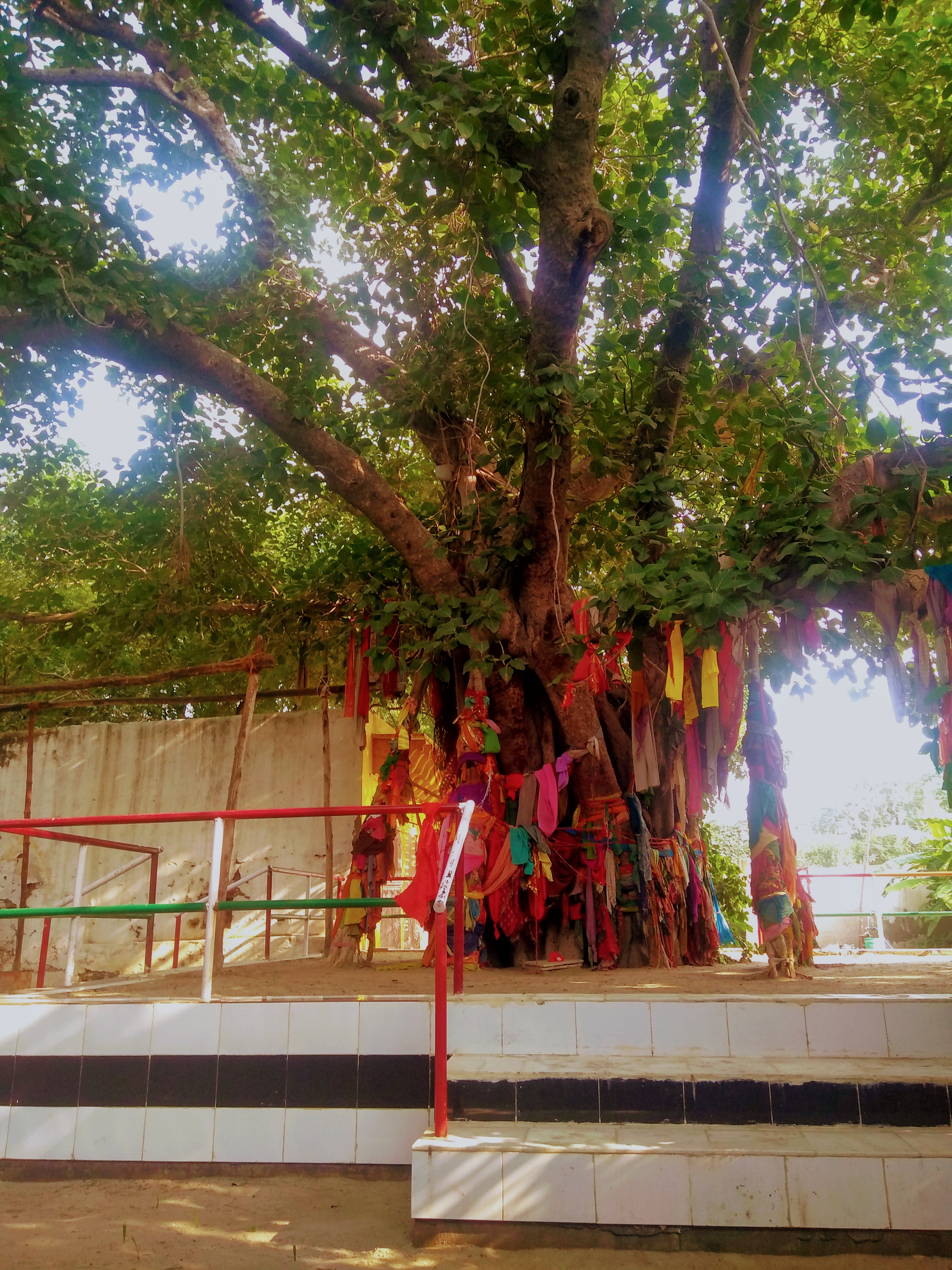
Vanshi Vat (tree) near Bhandirvan temple

== How to reach ==
- Location - Bhandirvan, Mant assembly constituency in Mathura district, Uttar Pradesh, India - 281202.
- By Rail - Nearest Railway station is Mathura Junction. Mathura is well connected with trains from across India.
- By Air - The nearest airport is in Agra at a distance of 100 km.
- By Road - Bhandirvan is around 27 km away from Mathura railway station and 20 km away from Krishna Balrama Mandir, Vrindavan. The local transport and cab facility is available at both the locations.

== Nearby attractions ==
=== Vanshivat, Vrindavan ===
Just nearby Bhandirvan (around 600 metres) is Vanshivat. In this place, Krishna used to eat lunch with his sakhas (friends) and play His flute to call Radharani and all the gopis. It is famous for the Maharaas. Lord Krishna along with Goddess Radha and gopis used to do Raslila under the Vanshivat tree. Presently, there is Radha Krishna temple constructed in Vanshivata and also the Vanshivata tree is still present in the temple premises.

=== Belvan, Vrindavan ===
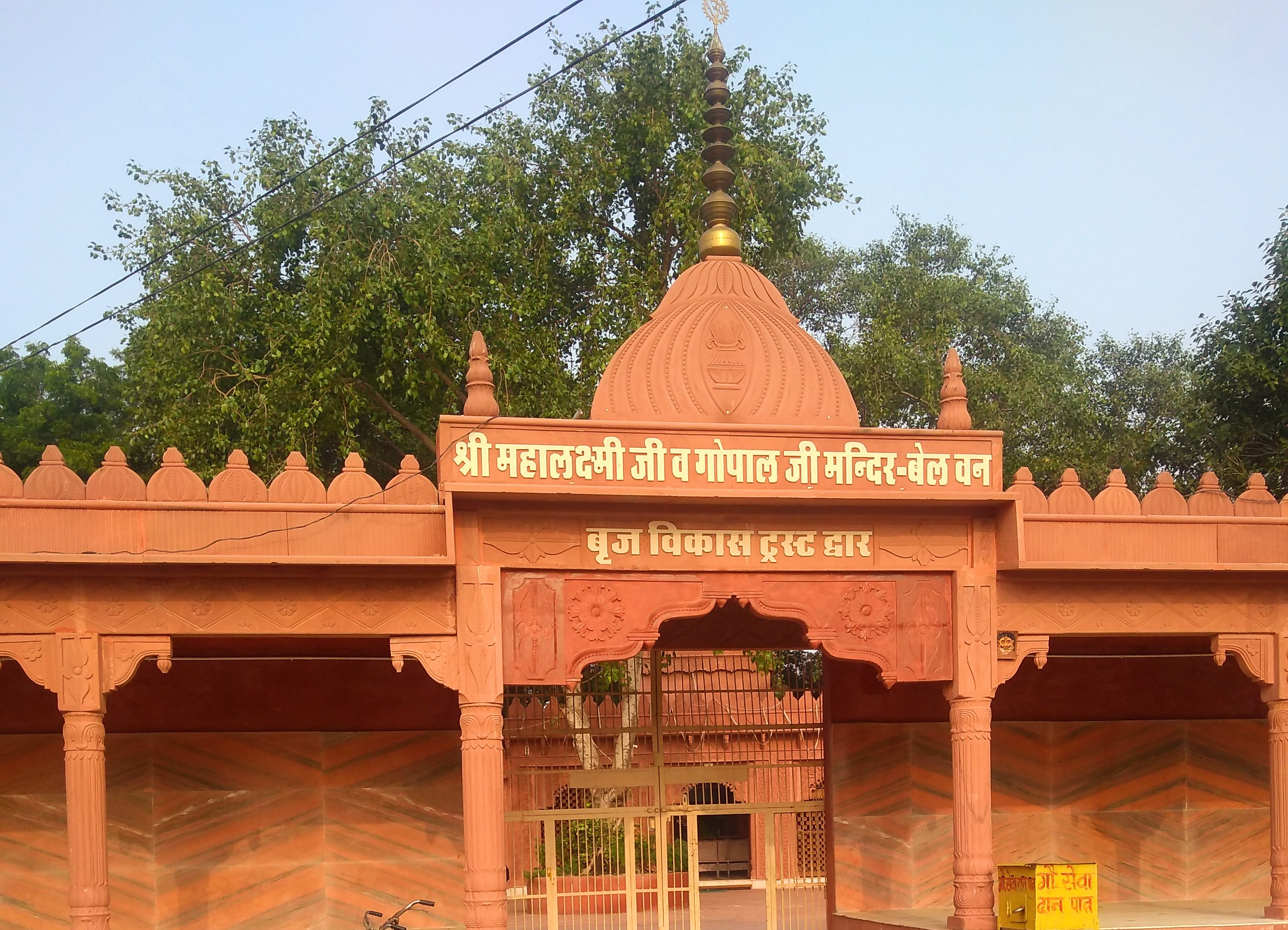
Mahalakshmi temple in Belvan

Belvan is around 8 km away from Bhandirvan. The place is famous for Goddess Mahalakshmi temple. According to locals, it is believed that Goddess Lakshmi is still doing austerities to be the part of Radha Krishna's Raslila.

=== Maan Sarovar, Vrindavan ===
Maan Sarovar is around 8 km away from Bhandirvan. In Maan Sarovar, there is a kund (lake) surrounded by huge trees and bird sanctuary. According to folklore, once Radharani pretends to get angry (Maan) from Krishna and came to this lake. On learning this, Krishna followed her to this lake and by his mesmerizing talk pleased her. There is temple on the bank of this lake dedicated to Srimati Radharani.

== See also ==
- Nidhivan, Vrindavan
- Radha Damodar Temple, Vrindavan
- Radha Madan Mohan Temple, Vrindavan
- Radha Vallabh Temple, Vrindavan
- Banke Bihari Temple, Vrindavana
- Radha Rani Temple, Barsana
- Radha Ramana Temple, Vrindavan
- Dwarkadheesh Temple, Mathura
