= Buddha Colony =

- Neighbourhood
- Location in Patna, India
- Coordinates: 25°37′8″N 85°7′42″E
- Country: India
- State: Bihar
- City: Patna

Languages
  - Spoken: Hindi, English
- Time zone: UTC+5:30 (IST)
- PIN: 800001
- Planning agency: Patna Metropolitan Area Authority
- Civic agency: Patna Municipal Corporation

Buddha Colony is a mixed residential neighbourhood in Patna, the capital city of Bihar. It is encircled by East Boring Canal Road, Rajapur- Bansghat road, Sri Krishna Nagar and Mandiri-Chakaram. It is a spacious residential colony with broad roads and lanes. The area is served by Buddha Colony police station under Patna Police.

== Transportation ==
Buddha Colony is 3 km from Patna Junction railway station and 4.5 km from Jay Prakash Narayan International Airport.

== Major Landmarks ==
- North Mandiri
- B. D. Public School
- College of Arts and Crafts, Patna
- Patna Women's College
- Patna Museum
- Mount Carmel High School, Patna
