= ISKCON Temple, Vrindavan =

Radha Krishna Temple in Vrindavan, India

Coordinates: 27°34′21″N 77°40′40″E

- Sri Sri Krishna Balarama Temple
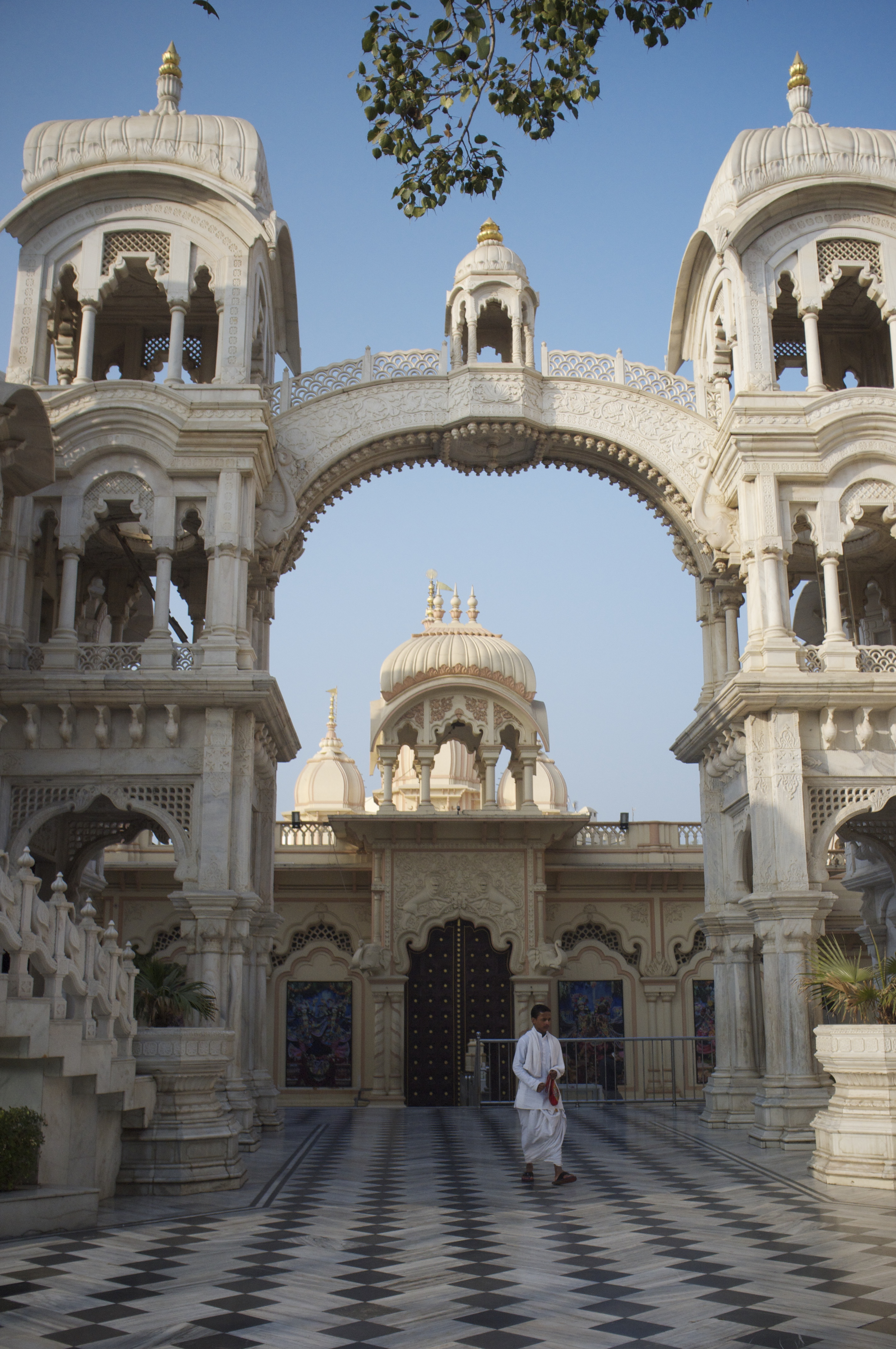

Religion
- Affiliation: Hinduism
- District: Mathura district
- Deity: Radha Krishna; Krishna Balarama; Gaura Nitai
- Festivals: Janamashtami, Radhashtami, Gaura Purnima, Holi

Location
- Location: Vrindavan
- State: Uttar Pradesh
- Country: India
- Interactive map of ISKCON Temple, Vrindavan

Architecture
- Type: Hindu architecture
- Completed: 1977
- Temple: 3

Website
- iskconvrindavan.com

ISKCON Vrindavan, also called Sri Krishna Balaram Mandir, is one of the major ISKCON temples in the world. It is a Gaudiya Vaishnava temple located in the city of Vrindavan, Mathura district, in the Indian state of Uttar Pradesh. The temple is dedicated to the Hindu gods Krishna and Balarama. The other deities of temple are Radha Krishna and Gauranga Nityananda.

== History ==
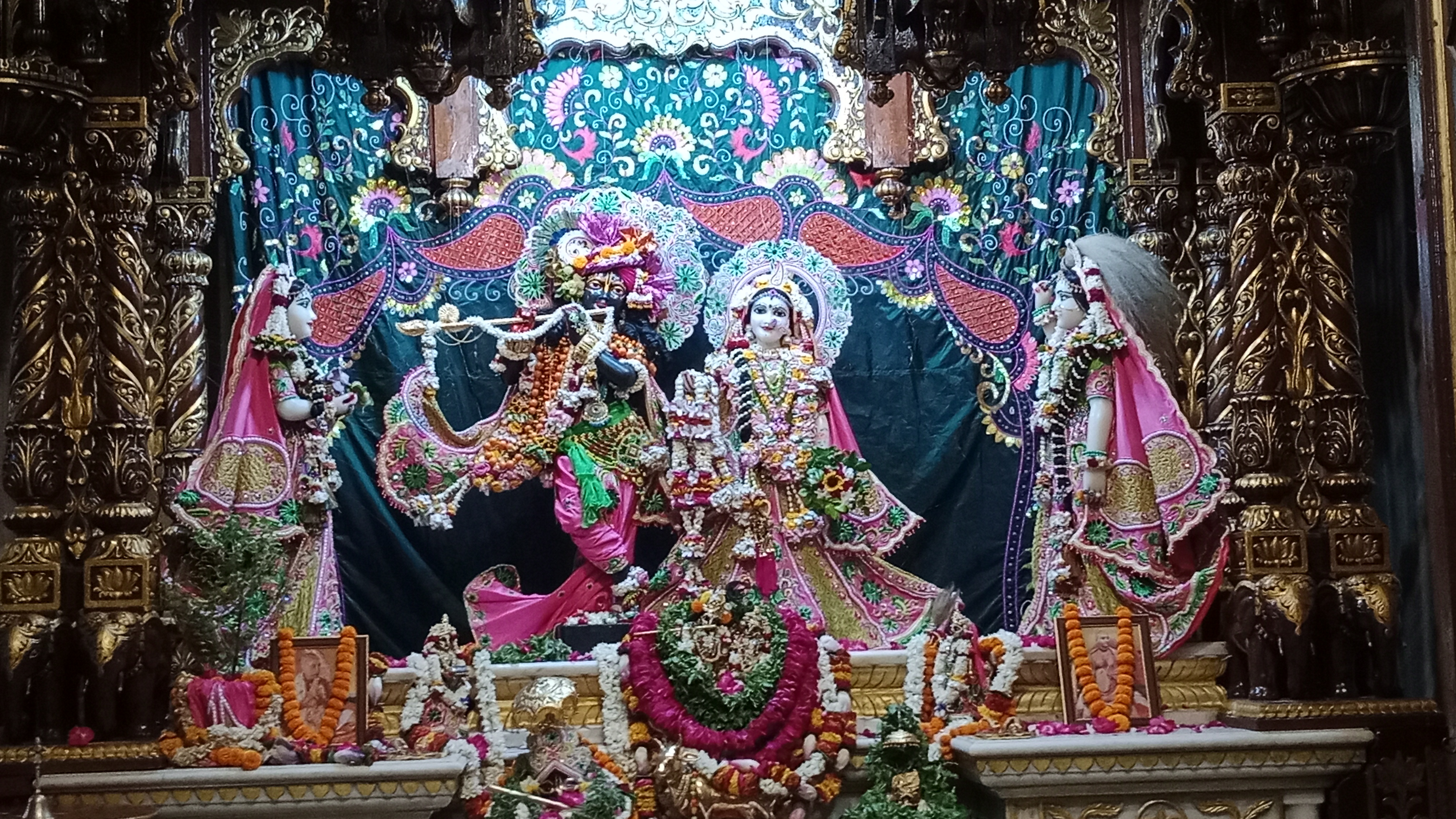
Radha Shyamsundar at ISKCON Vrindavan

A. C. Bhaktivedanta Swami Prabhupada, founder–acharya of the International Society for Krishna Consciousness, inaugurated the Krishna Balaram Mandir and installed deities (murtis) of Krishna–Balaram, Radha–Shyamasundar, the gopis Lalita Devi and Vishakha Devi, and Gaura–Nitai on Ram Navami (April 20) 1975.

== Deities ==
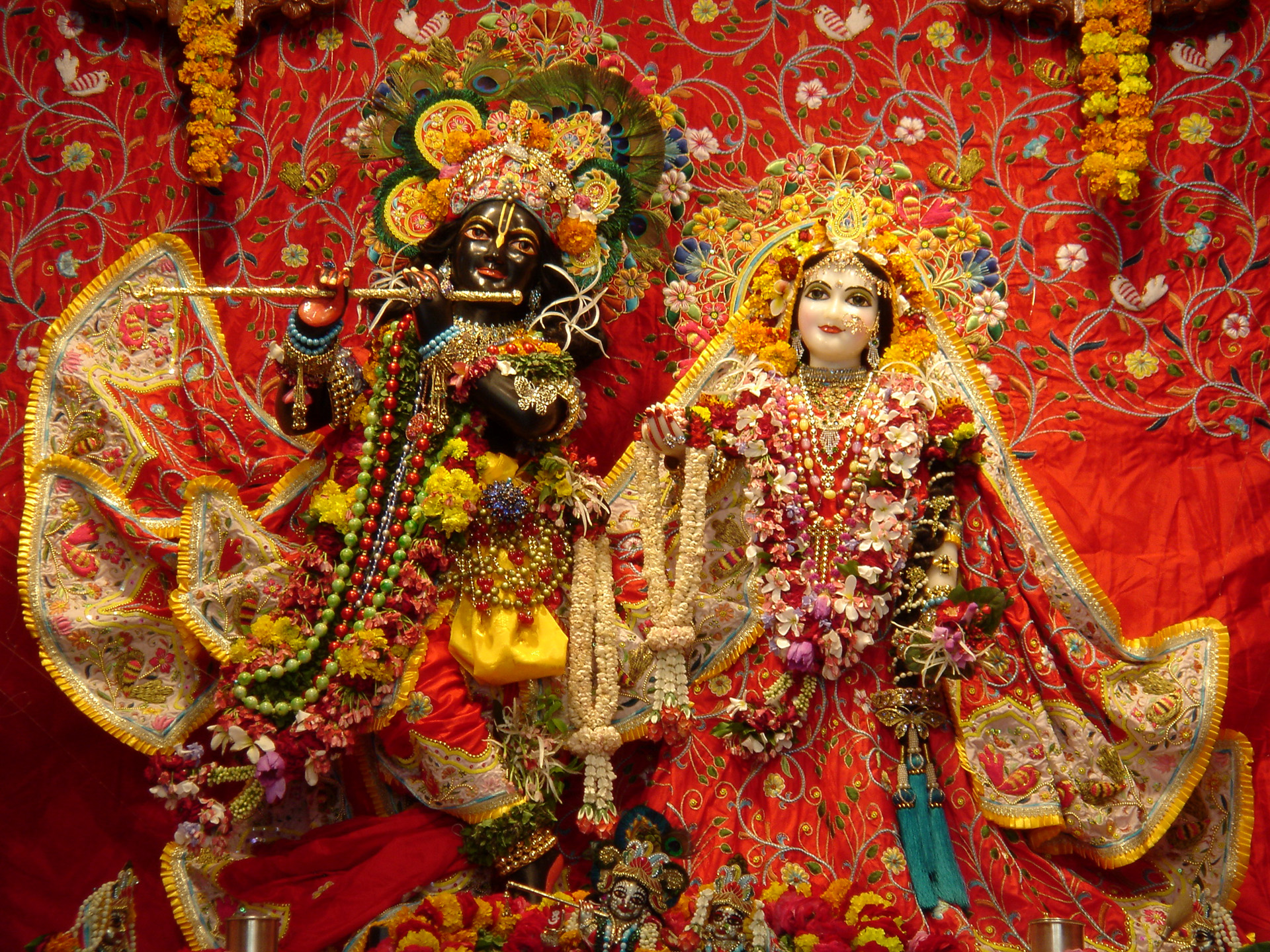
Radha Shyamasundar at the temple on Radhashtami

The presiding deities of the temple are Krishna and Balarama at the central altar. On the right altar are Radha Krishna as Sri Sri Radha Shyamsundar with the gopis Lalita and Vishakha. On the left altar are Chaitanya Mahaprabhu with Nityananda, and ISKCON founder A. C. Bhaktivedanta Swami Prabhupada and his guru Bhaktisiddhanta Sarasvati.

Near the temple, at the entrance to the complex, is the samadhi mandir of Prabhupada, built of white marble.

== Festivals ==
- Krishna Janmashtami - Birth anniversary of Krishna
- Radhashtami - Birth anniversary of Radha
- Balarama Purnima - Birth anniversary of Balarama
- Gaura-purnima - Birth anniversary of Chaitanya Mahaprabhu
- Nityananda trayodashi - Birthday anniversary of Nityananda
- Gopashtami - Festival dedicated to pastimes of Krishna with Cows
- Holi - Festival of love and colours, Major festival associated with pastimes of Radha Krishna
- Sharad Purnima - Festival associated with the maharaas of Radha Krishna and gopis.
- Kartik Purnima - Festival associated with raslia of Radha-Krishna and gopis.
- Chaturmaas
- Kartik Damodar Maas - Kartik month celebration which is believed to be the most auspicious month for the worship of Radha Krishna
- Diwali - Major Hindu festival dedicated to Sita Rama (another form of Radha Krishna)
- Appearance and disappearance days (birth and death days) of Vaishnava acharyas and saints.

== Gallery ==
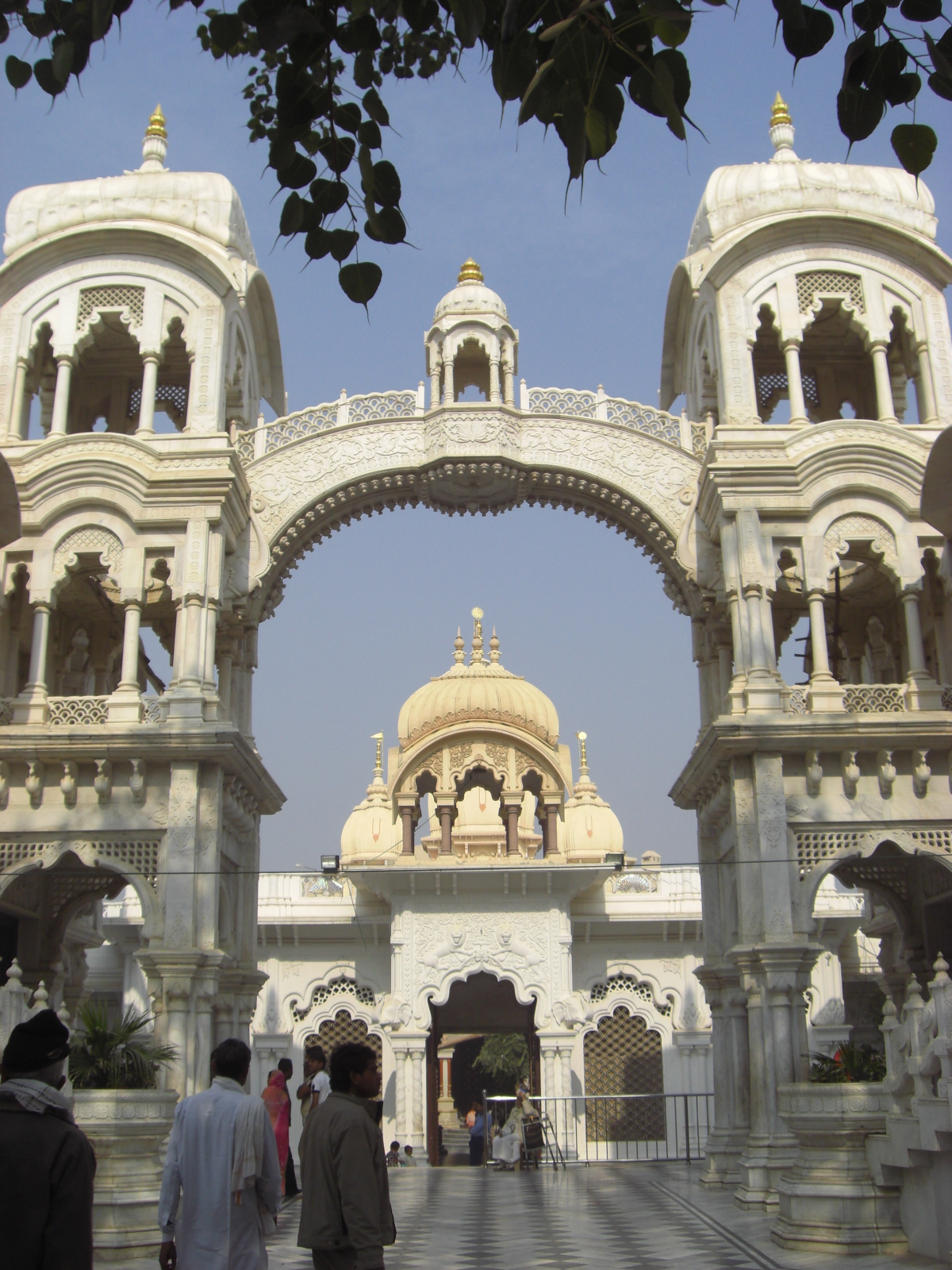
ISKCON Temple, Vrindavan

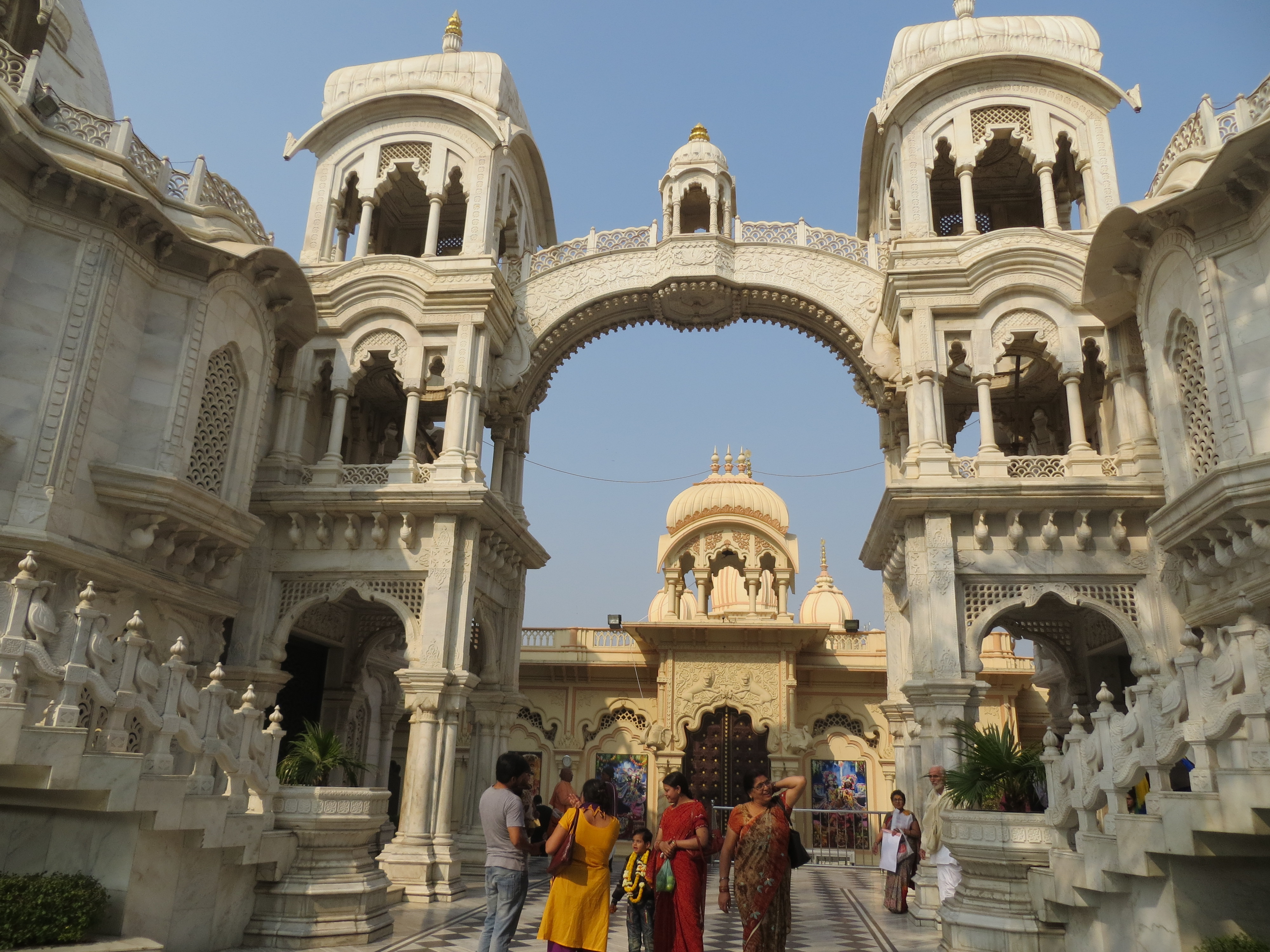
Outer appearance of temple

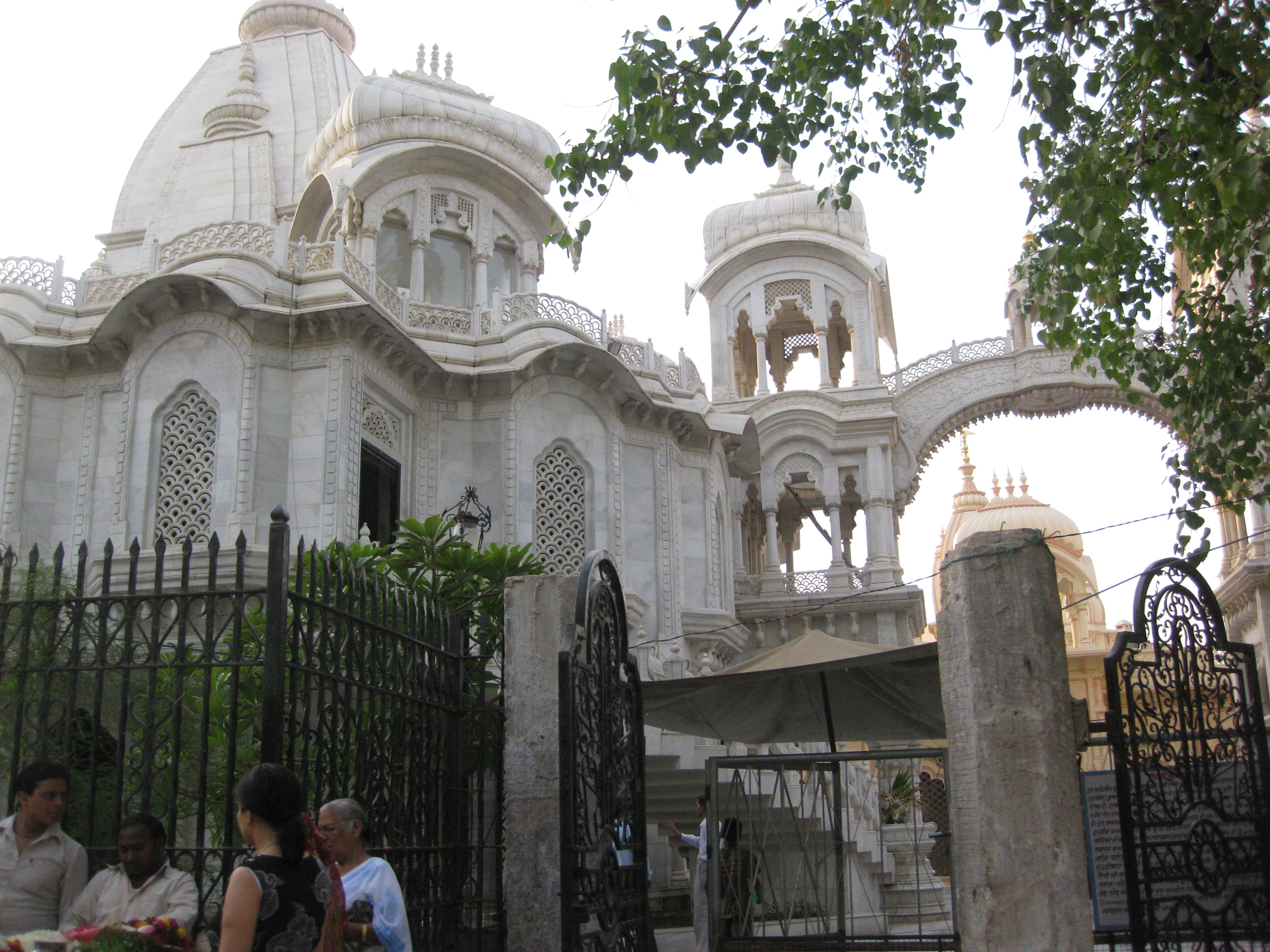
Entrance of ISKCON Temple, Vrindavan

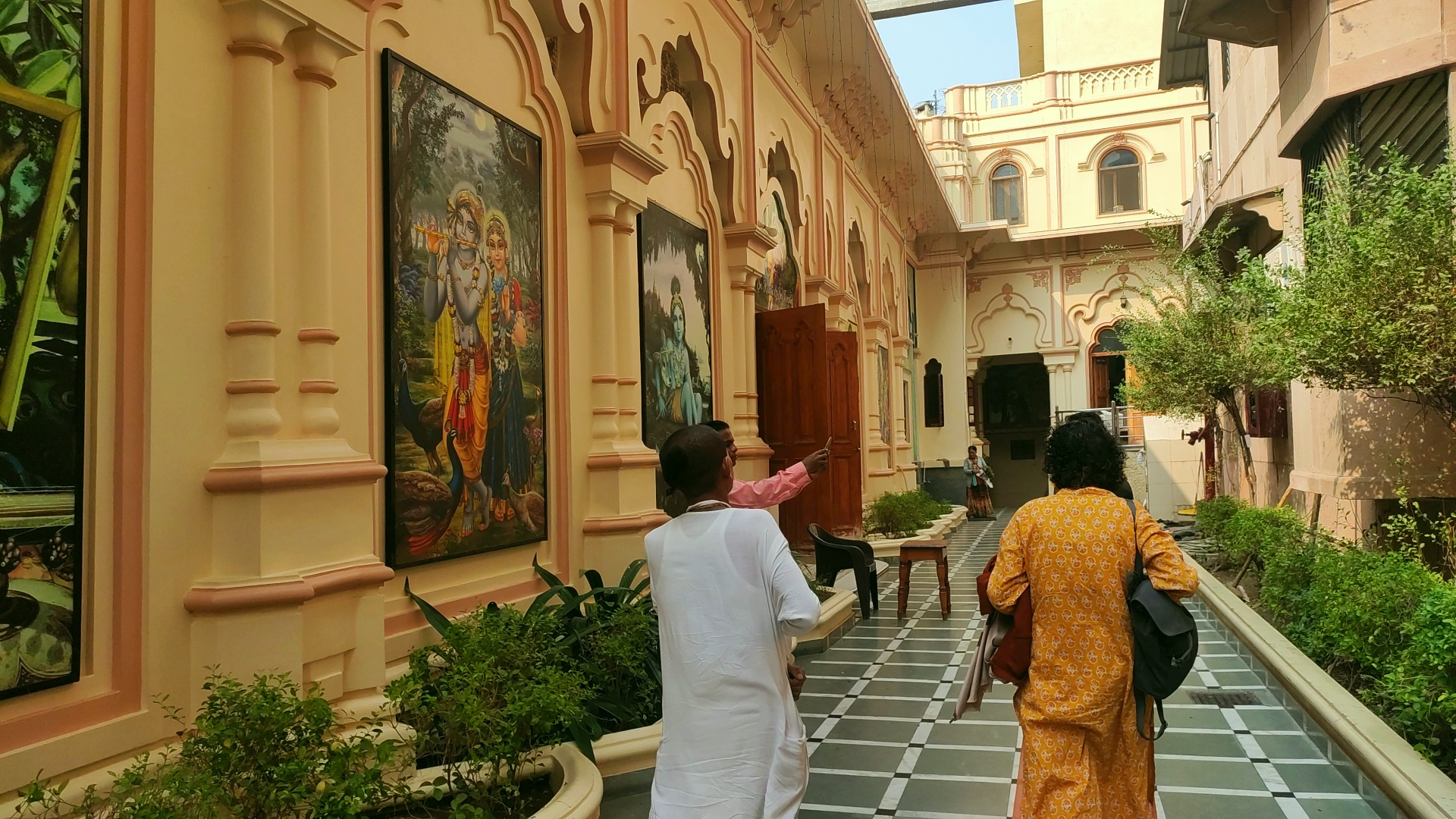
Alley inside temple

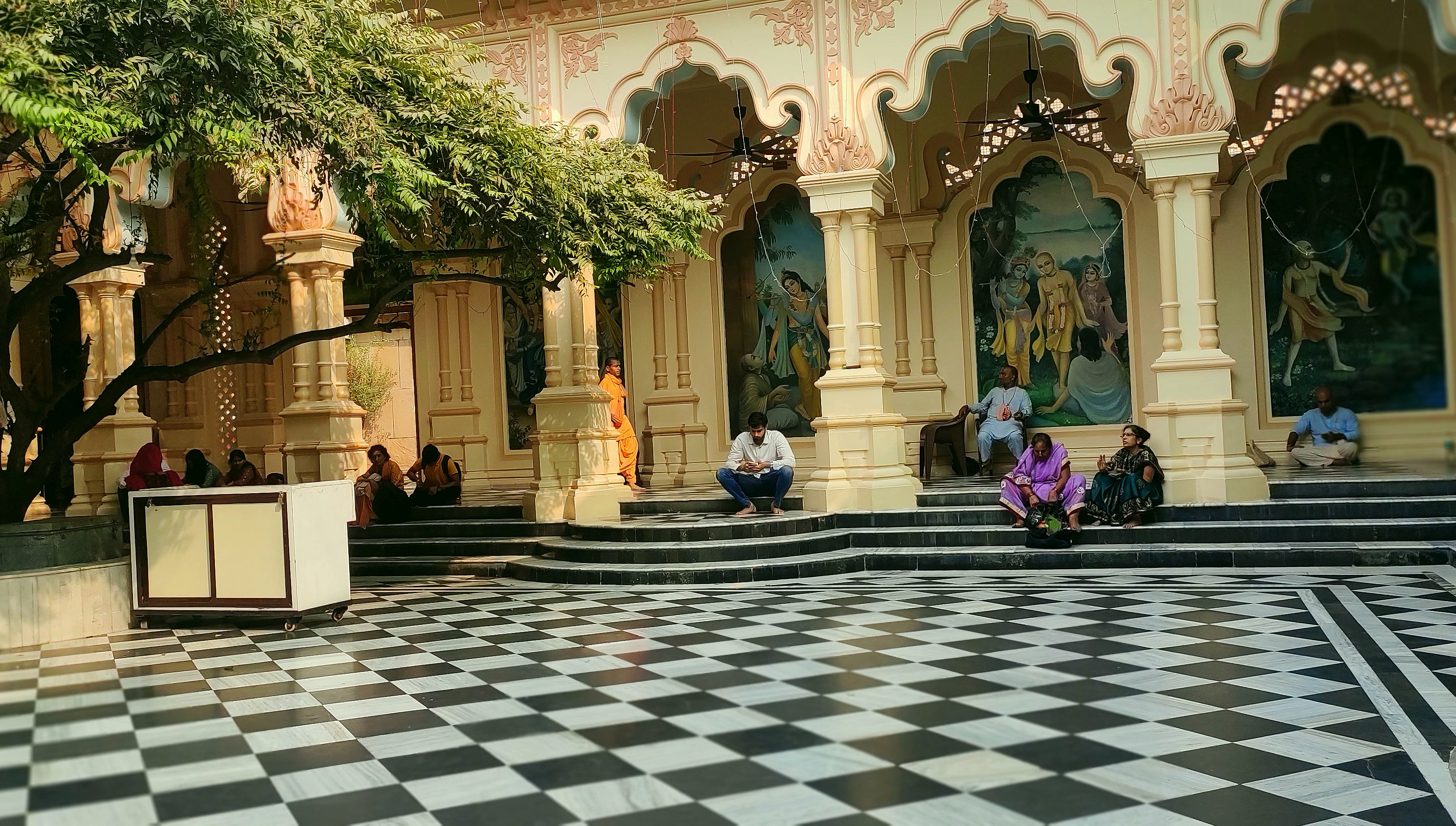
Inside area of temple

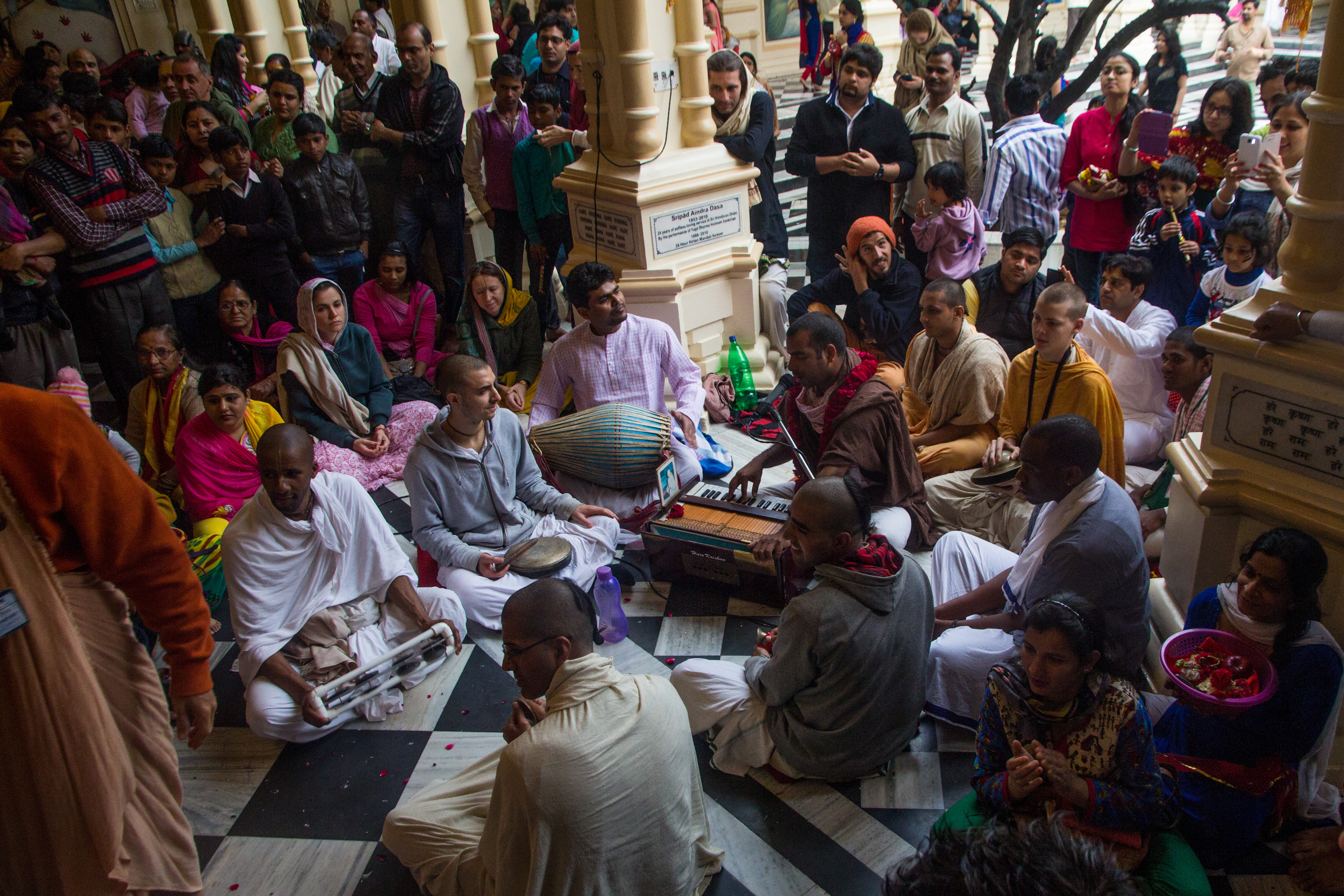
24 hours kirtan is performed inside the temple

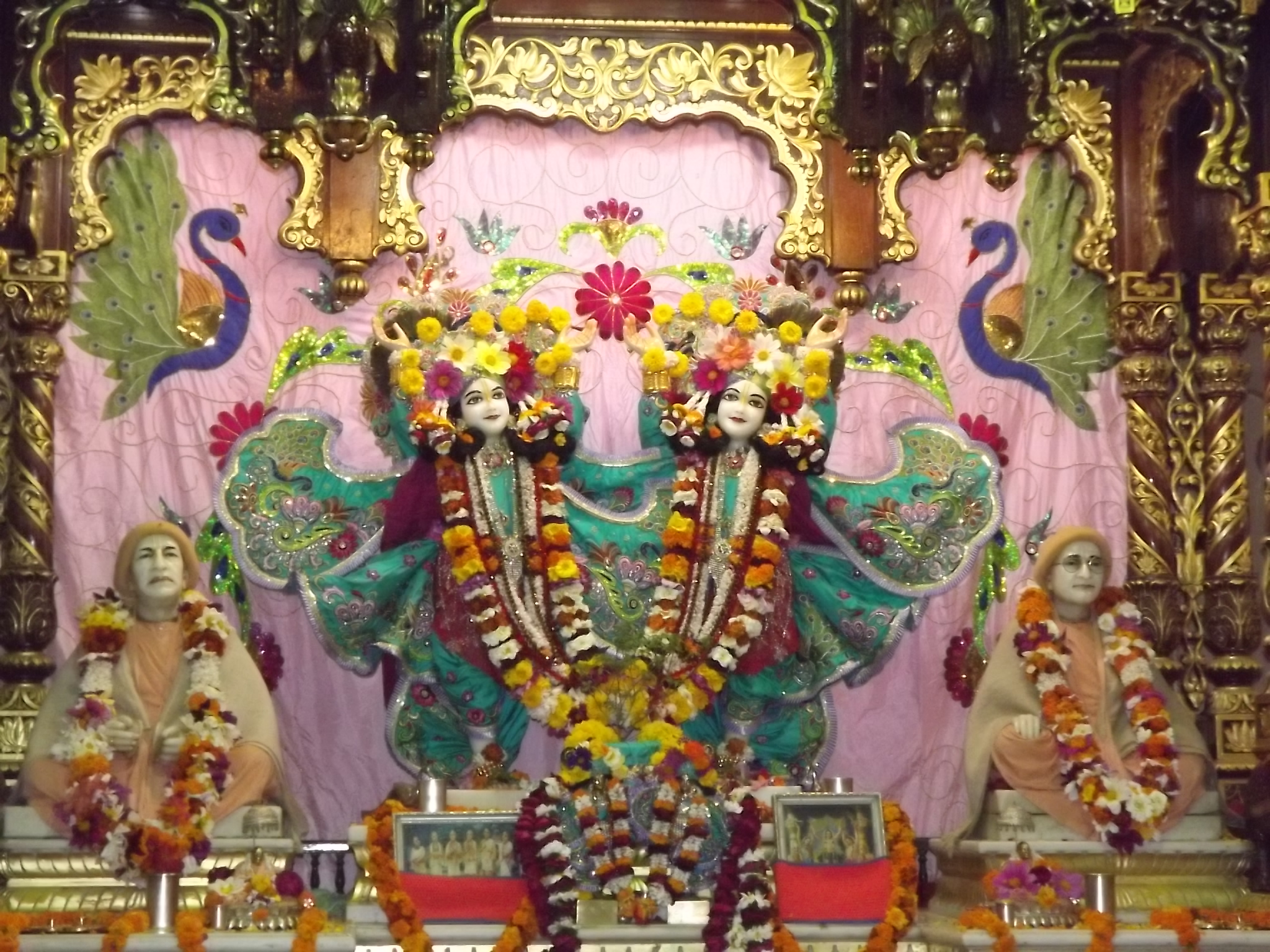
Deities of temple - Gaura Nitai

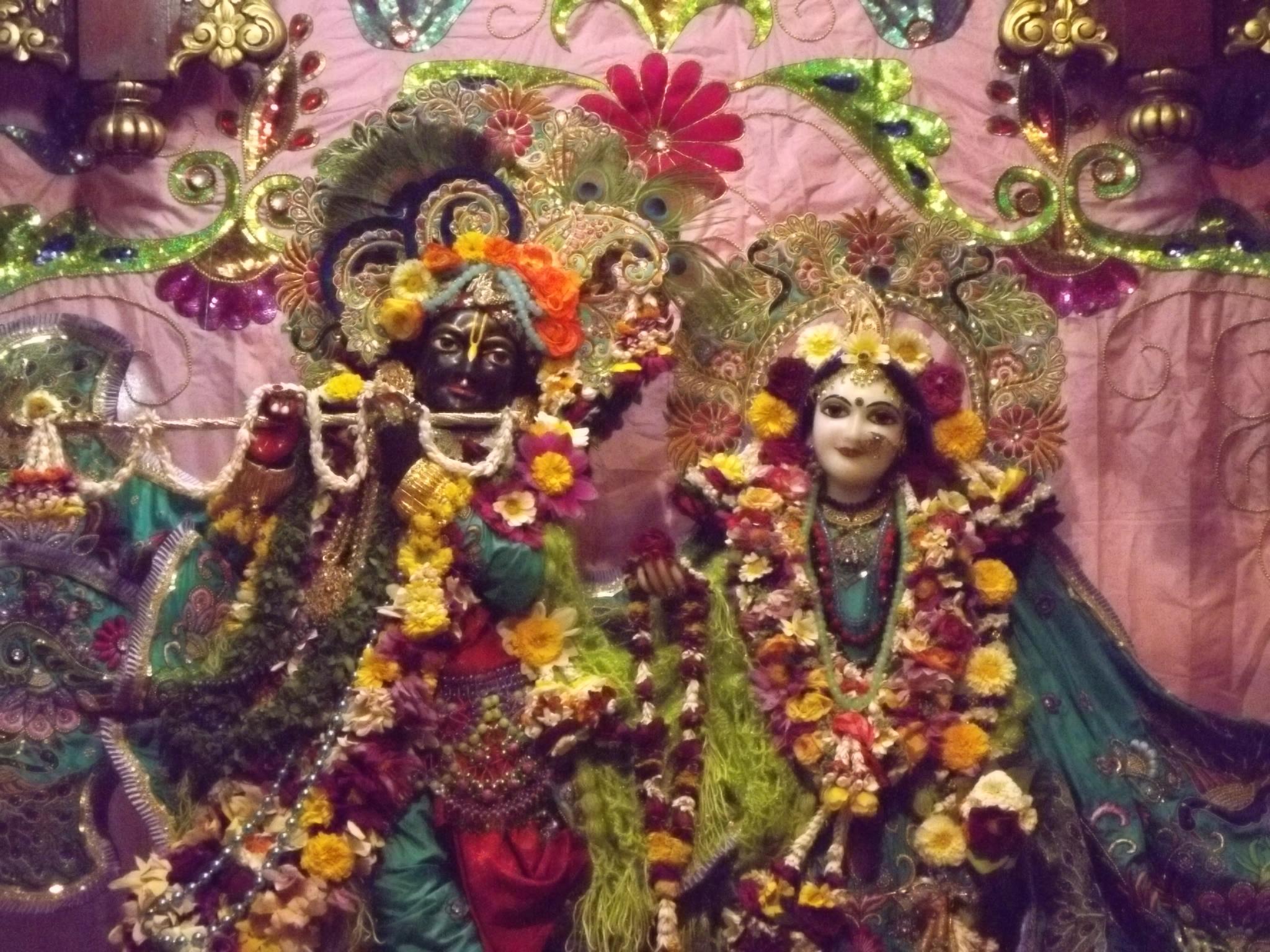
Deities of temple - Radha Shyamsundar

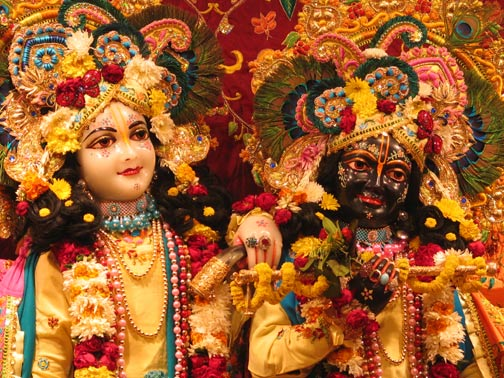
Deities of temple- Krishna Balram

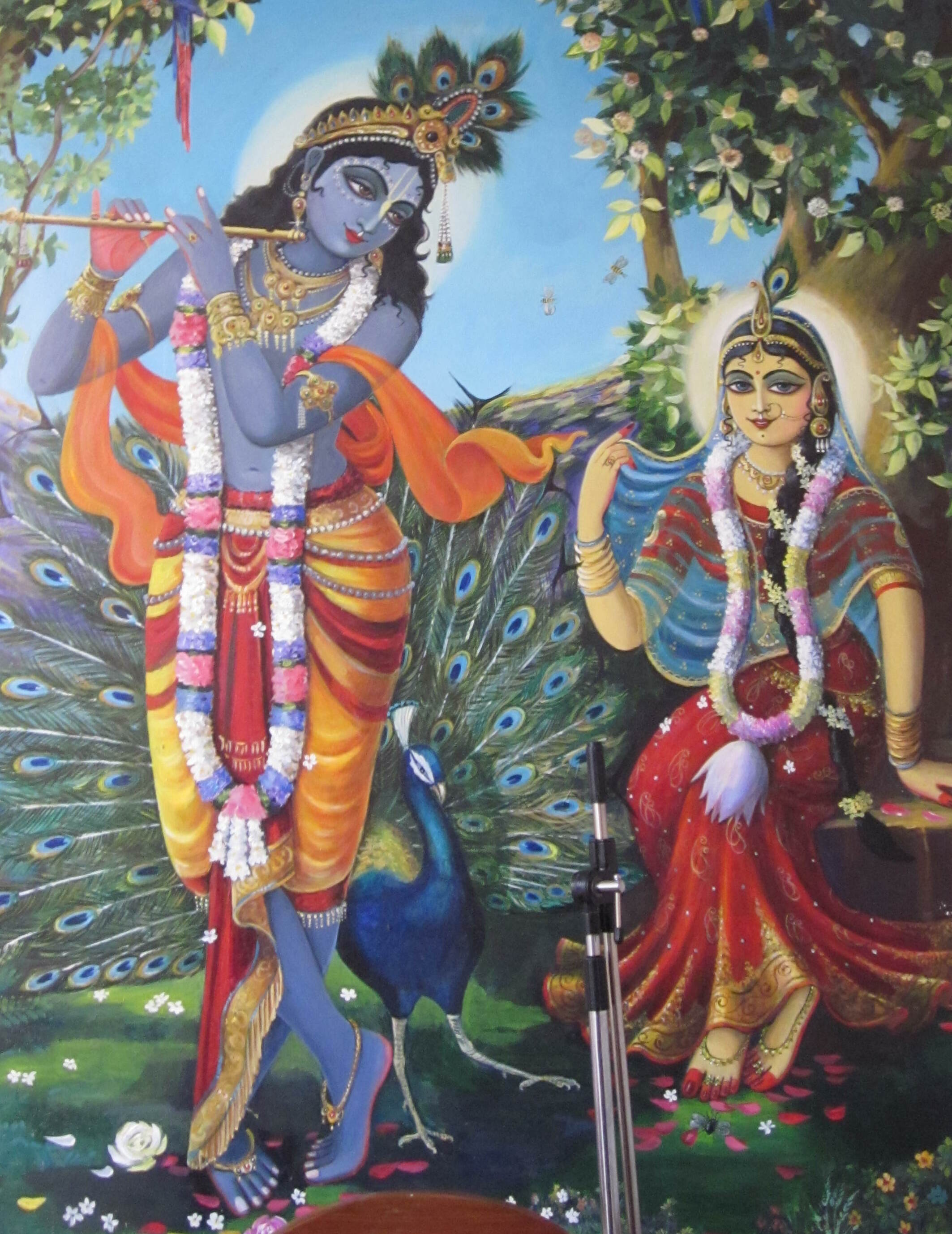
Wall art of Radha Krishna inside temple

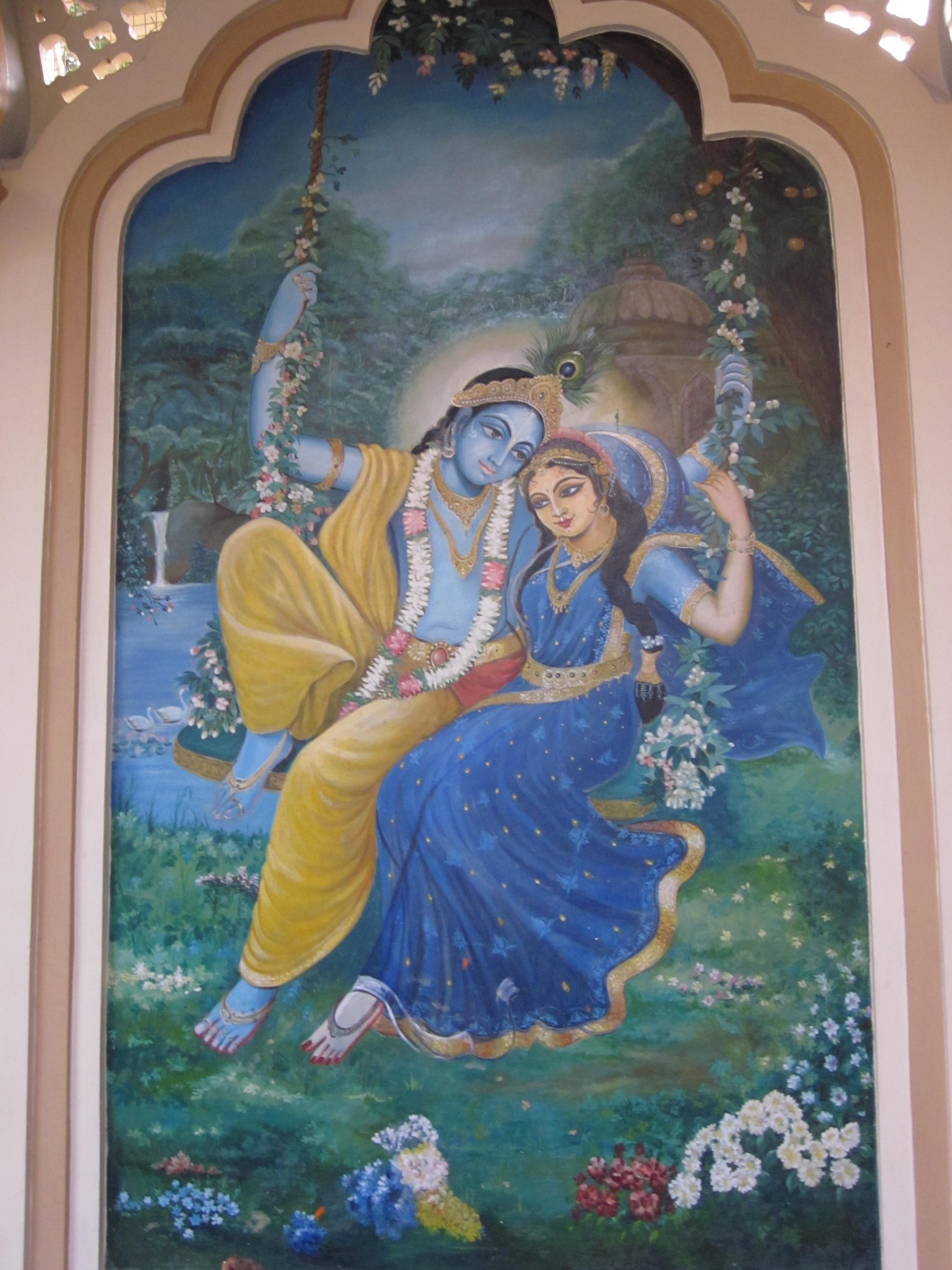
Wall art of Radha Krishna on swing inside the temple

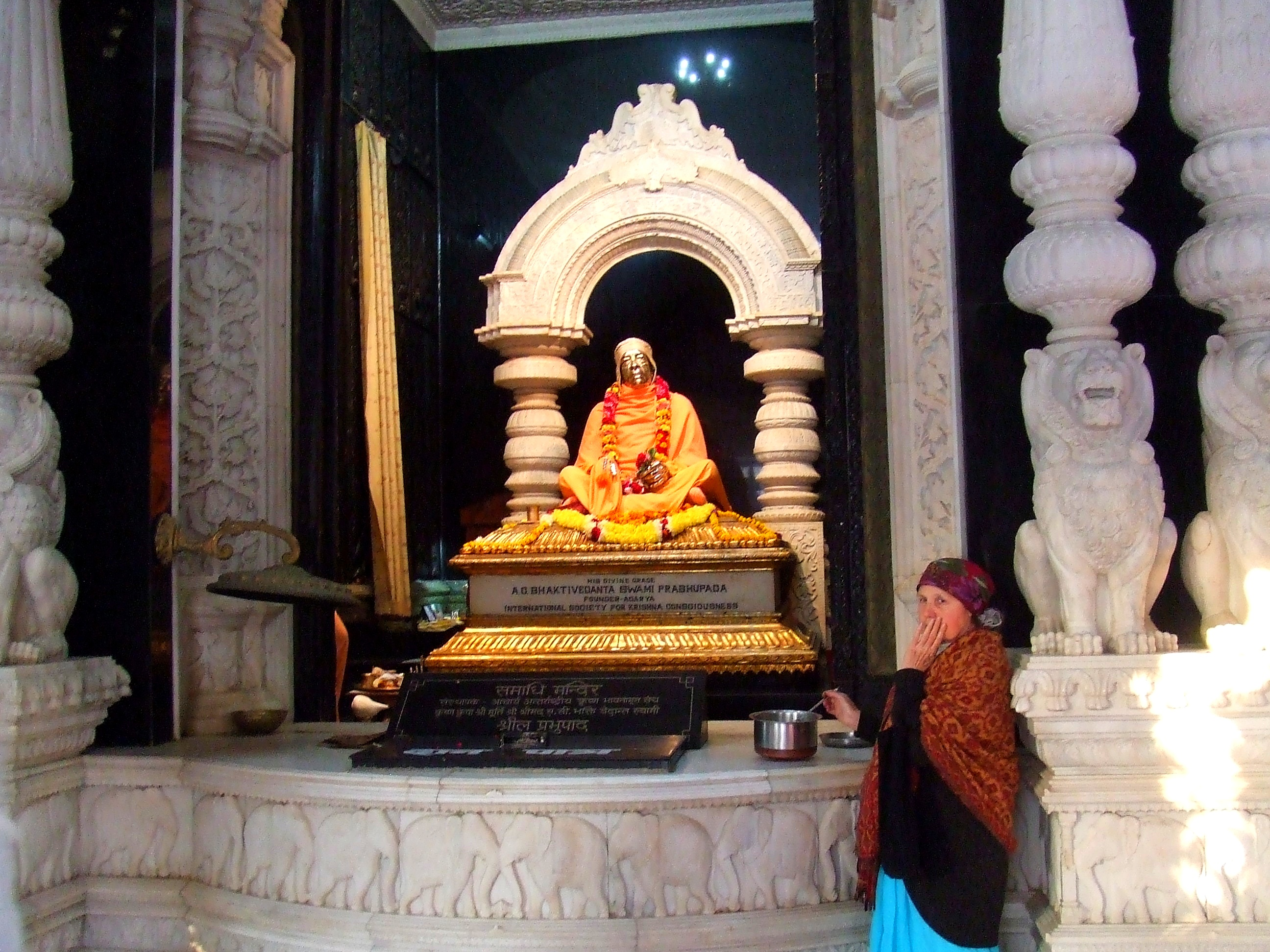
Samadhi temple of Srila Prabhupada, founder of ISKCON temple, Vrindavan

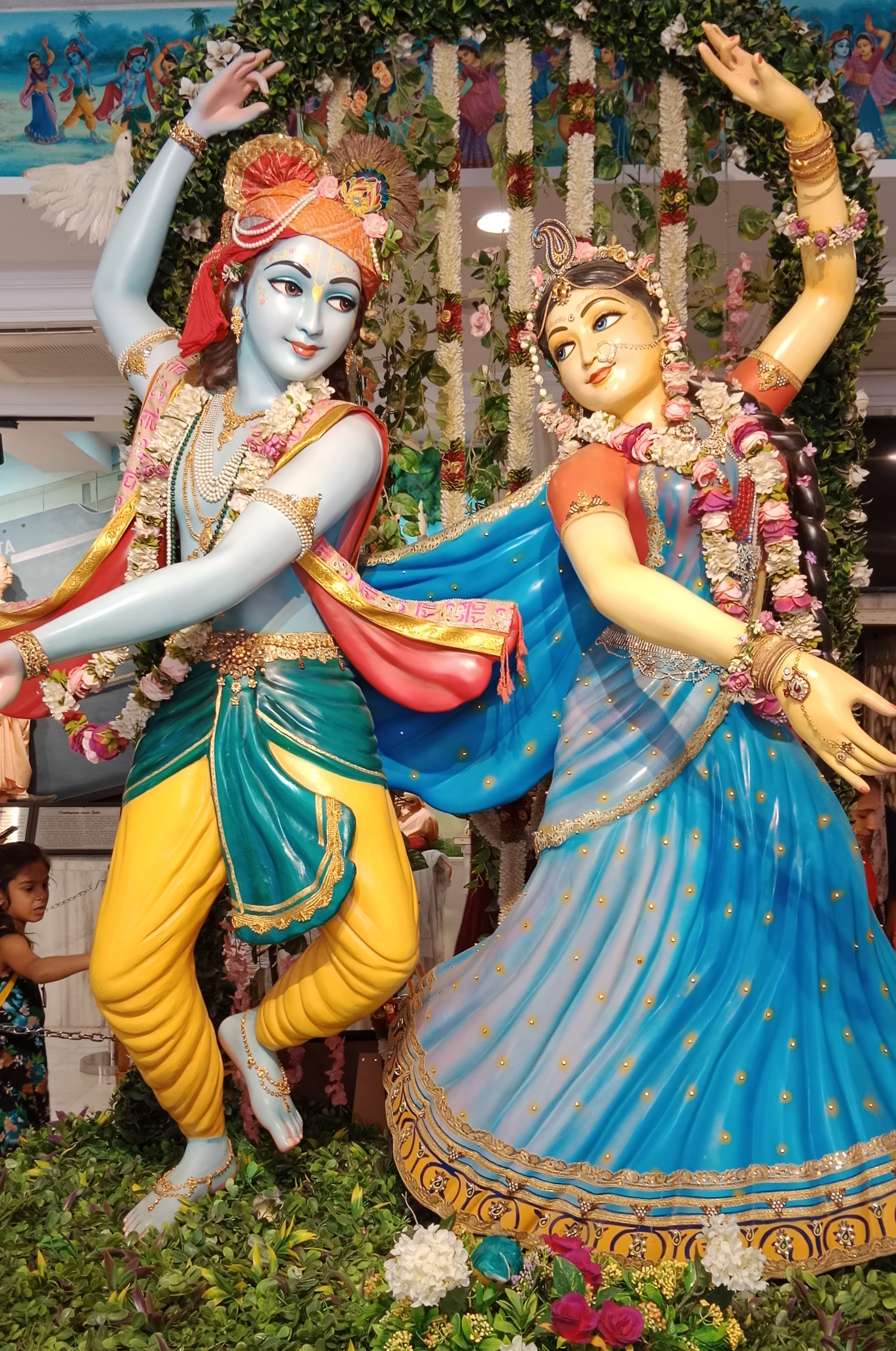
Idols of Radha Krishna inside temple museum

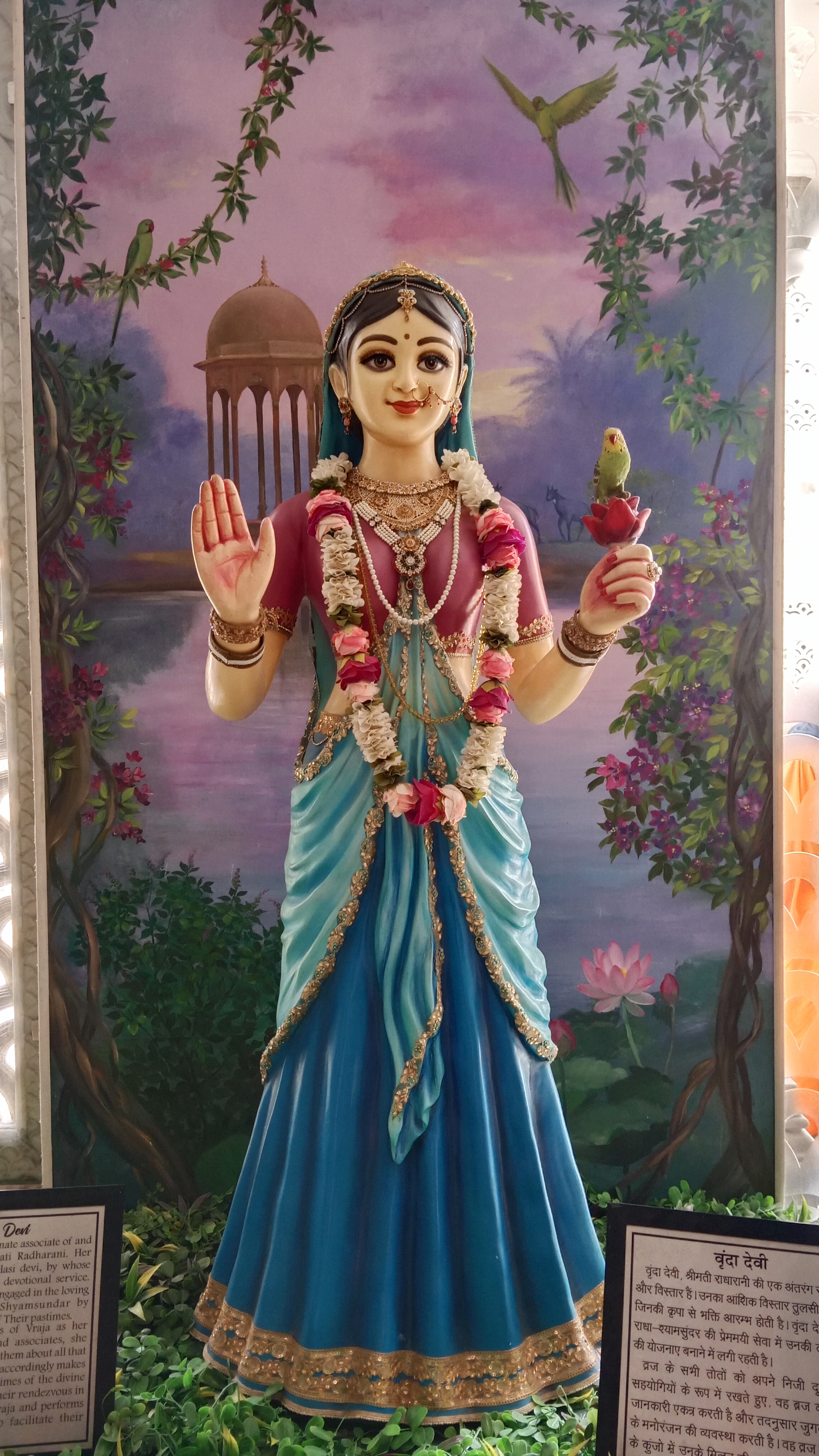
Idol of goddess Vrinda inside temple museum

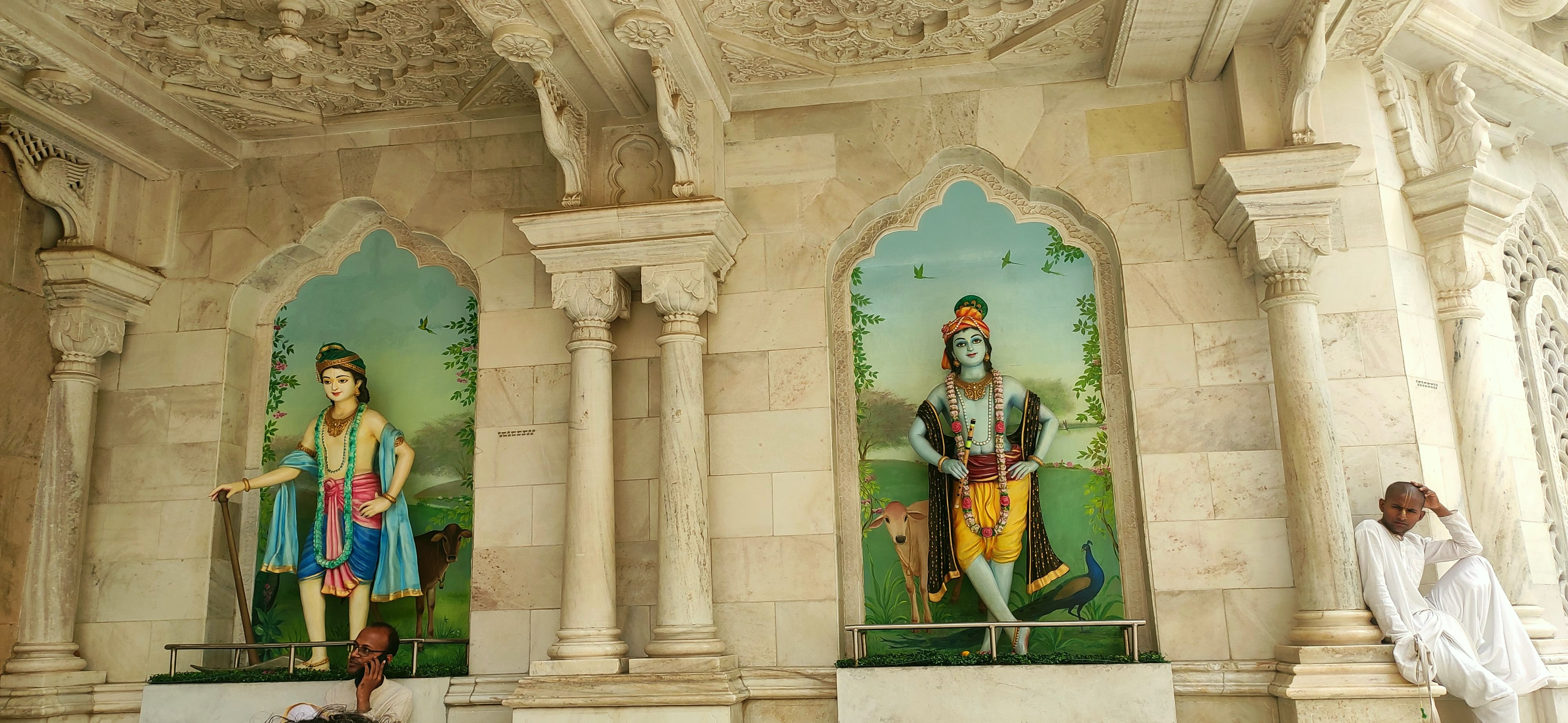
Statues of Krishna Balram outside temple museum

== See also ==
- Prem Mandir Vrindavan
- Banke Bihari Temple
- Radha Rani Temple, Barsana
- Radha Raman Temple
- Nandmahar Dham
- Radha Damodar Temple, Vrindavan
- Radha Madan Mohan Temple, Vrindavan
- Radha Krishna Vivah Sthali, Bhandirvan
