= ISKCON Krishna House =

Radha Krishna Temple in Columbus, USA

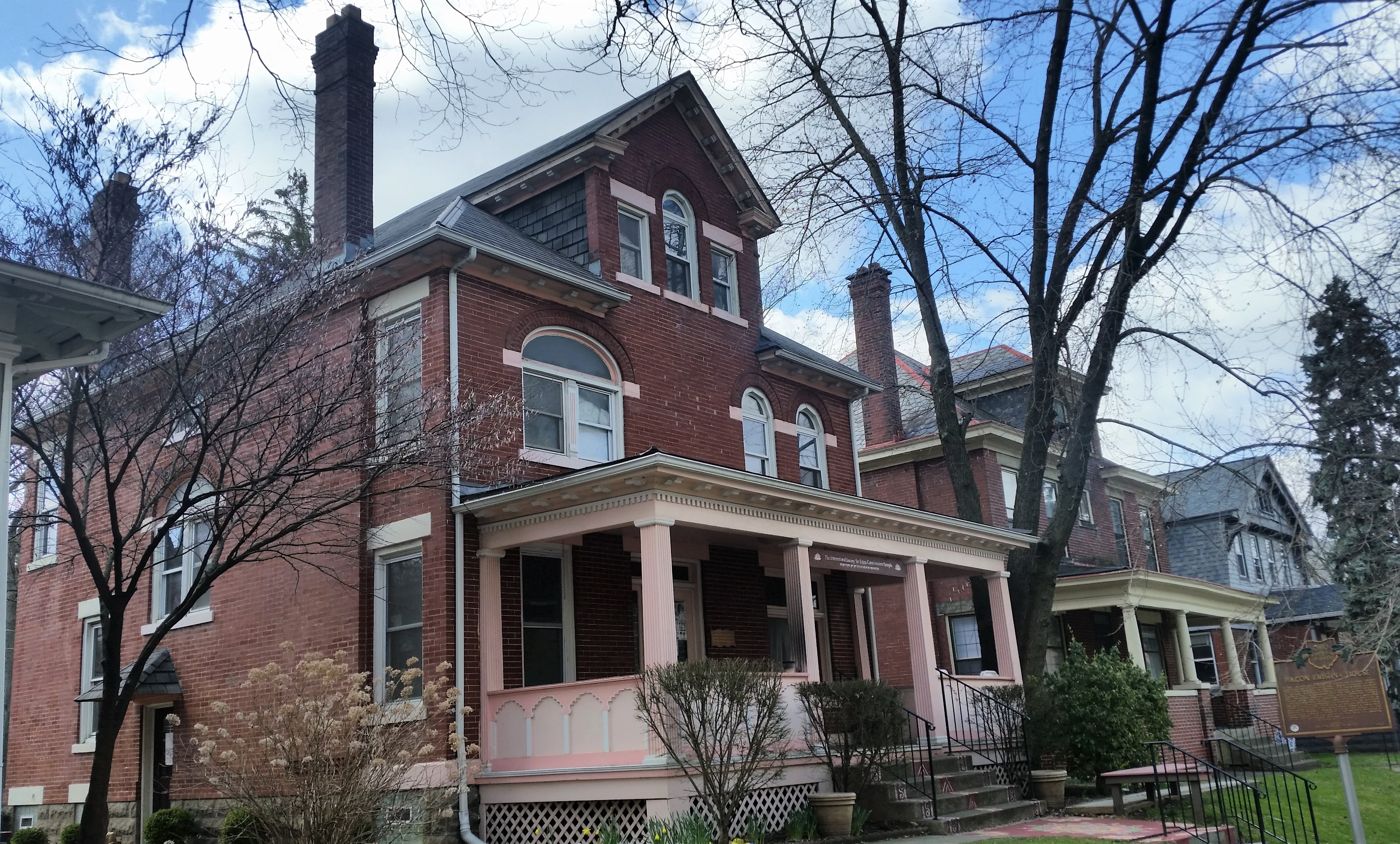
- The temple in 2022

- Location in Ohio

Religion
- Affiliation: Hinduism
- Deity: Krishna
- Status: Open

Location
- Location: 379 West 8th Avenue, Columbus, Ohio 43201
- Country: United States
- Coordinates: 39.992727834954685°N 83.01410438751034°W

Architecture
- Founder: International Society for Krishna Consciousness
- Established: 1969

Website
- www.iskconcolumbus.com

The ISKCON Krishna House is a Hare Krishna temple in Columbus, Ohio. It was established in 1969 and is the oldest Hindu temple in Ohio. Its significance has been recognized with an Ohio Historical Society marker.

== History ==
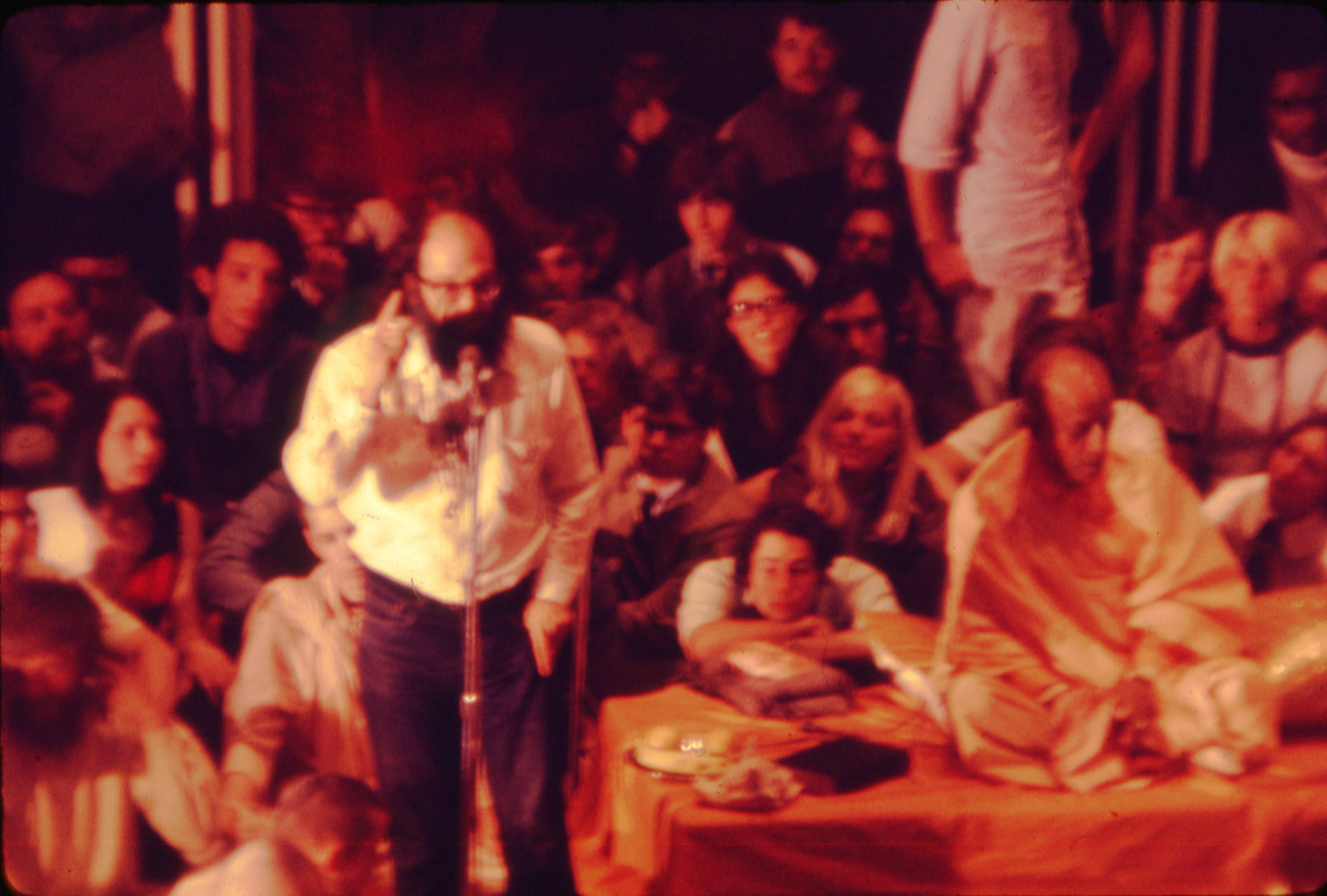
Allen Ginsberg and A.C. Bhaktivedanta Swami Prabhupada at Ohio State University in 1969

=== 1969-1971: East 20th Avenue ===
In October 1968, Ohio State University professor and Hare Krishna devotee Howard Wheeler founded the Ohio State Yoga Club. The club marked the first Hare Krishna presence on campus. It offered guidance on mantra chanting, dancing, and cooking Indian food and discussions on Indian philosophy. Wheeler invited International Society for Krishna Consciousness (ISKCON) founder A. C. Bhaktivedanta Swami Prabhupada to campus, and on May 12, 1969, Prabhupada and renowned poet Allen Ginsberg gave a joint program at the university. Roger Lambert of The Lantern described the scene:

Hundreds of persons jammed into the theater and clusters of other hopefuls paced expectantly outside the auditorium doors...Others found a way onto the stage and lifted the curtains to find themselves standing five feet from Ginsberg and the holy man..."Hare Krishna, Hare Krishna, Krishna Krishna, Hare Hare, Hare Rama, Hare Rama, Rama Rama, Hare Hare," chanted the students, over and over again, clapping and dancing to the rhythmic drone of the Indian incantation.

Around the same time, Wheeler and Ohio State student Paul Sherbow established the first Hare Krishna temple in Columbus near the university at 318 East 20th Avenue, where Prabhupada stayed during his visit. Named the Radha Krishna Temple, it had twelve members at the time of its founding. It offered Bhagavad Gita classes, food, and housing for devotees. Prabhupada's visit precipitated a membership drive for the temple. At the end of the 1969-70 academic year The Lantern wrote, "...(in) the past few months...Hare Krishna,...with their flowing gowns and theological Muzak, drove the already punchy student body to sovereign insanity."

By 1971, temple membership had grown to around thirty-six. In the same year, The Columbus Dispatch observed temple members chanting near the Ohio Statehouse. In May 1971 The Lantern wrote, "the (Hare Krishna) chant, sung daily by a handful of robed people at 15th Avenue and High Street, has become as much a part of the campus scene as attending football games and sunning on the Oval."

=== 1977-1981: East 13th Avenue ===
After closing for several years, the temple reopened at 99 East 13th Avenue in 1977. It contained a restaurant offering an all-you-can-eat vegetarian lunch for 99 cents. In 1978, the temple held its first Festival of Chariots parade in Downtown Columbus.

ISKCON leader Kirtanananda Swami visited the temple in January 1979 and held a press conference to condemn the mass murder/suicide in Jonestown, Guyana in an effort to distinguish his organization from cults. Kirtanananda advised evaluating a religious teacher, observing whether 'his actions always match-up with his words' before following their teachings.

The temple closed in 1981 following a decline in community interest.

=== 1983-present: West 8th Avenue ===
In 1983, the temple reopened at 379 West 8th Avenue, its current location. By 1986, membership had grown to about sixty. In the same year, the temple hosted a three-day Festival of Chariots on the Ohio State campus to promote Krishna Consciousness and Indian culture. Kirtanananda made media appearances at the temple in May 1987 and March 1988 to defend the Hare Krishnas and criticize "religious persecution" in the face of ongoing state and federal investigations of the organization.

In May 1996 The Lantern ran a full-page article on the temple and its activities.

In 2003 the Ohio Historical Historical Society installed a marker in front of the temple to indicate its significance as the first Hindu temple in Ohio. By 2008, membership had increased to around 200. In contrast with the temple's early years, most devotees were of Indian descent. Its membership also included Ohio State students interested in Eastern religions and vegetarianism.

By 2017, membership had grown to 400. In response to this growth, the temple purchased 53 acres of land in suburban Hilliard on which to build a new temple. Groundbreaking occurred on June 25, 2022. The new temple is designed by architect Tim Lai and will be LEED certified. It will include an art gallery, classrooms, a dining hall, an event space, a farm-to-table restaurant, a gift shop, guest rooms, kitchens, a library, living quarters, a lounge, a large temple room, and a yoga studio. Its grounds will include a cow pasture and sanctuary, gardens, an orchard, an organic farm, and walking trails. The existing temple will remain open to serve the Ohio State community.

== Architecture ==
The temple is a brick house with peach trim. Its exterior is similar to those of the other historic houses on West 8th Avenue. The house was built in 1900 in a "conventional" architectural style on a 6,928 square foot (0.16 acre) lot. It has 1,080 square feet of interior space, including four bedrooms and one bathroom.

== Deities ==
The temple has a golden altar with Radha and Krishna deities. It also has a life-size statue of ISKCON founder Prabhupada.

== Administration ==
The temple is administered by a four-member council.
