= Bhagavad Gita As It Is trial =

Russian 2011 Trial

The Russian edition of Bhagavad Gita As It Is, which was put on trial in Tomsk.

In 2011, a trial was commenced to ban the Russian edition of the book Bhagavad Gita As It Is (1968), a translation and commentary of the Hindu holy text Bhagavad Gita, on charges that the commentaries fomented religious extremism. It contains a translation and commentary by A.C. Bhaktivedanta Swami Prabhupada, founder of the International Society for Krishna Consciousness (ISKCON), commonly known as the Hare Krishna movement.

The trial was initiated in June 2011 in Tomsk, Russia, based on an assessment of the book by scholars of Tomsk State University, which concluded that Prabhupada's commentaries incite religious, social, and racial intolerance. The trial caused controversy, which was reported in the Indian, Russian, and international media, as well as on social networks. The Indian government harshly criticized the proposed ban as "patently absurd" undertaking of "ignorant and misdirected or motivated individuals". The overwhelmingly wide negative response to the trial forced Russian officials to offer apologies to India, promising the necessary remedial measures to prevent the ban. The trial also sparked public protests and legal actions in India against the proposed ban and drew harsh criticism of the intellectual community in Russia, leading Russian scholars publicly denounced the perpetuation of the trial. The scholars appealed to President Dmitry Medvedev and Premier Vladimir Putin for intervention and warned them of the trial's negative consequences for India-Russia relations and for Russia's international reputation.

In December 2011, the judge dismissed the court case, a decision praised by the communities both in India and Russia. On 26 January 2012, the Tomsk prosecutor's office filed an appeal against the judge's ruling, but on 21 March 2012, the appeal court dismissed it, upholding the lower court's verdict. On 29 May 2012 Tomsk region prosecutor's office decided not to challenge the appeal court's verdict.

== The book ==
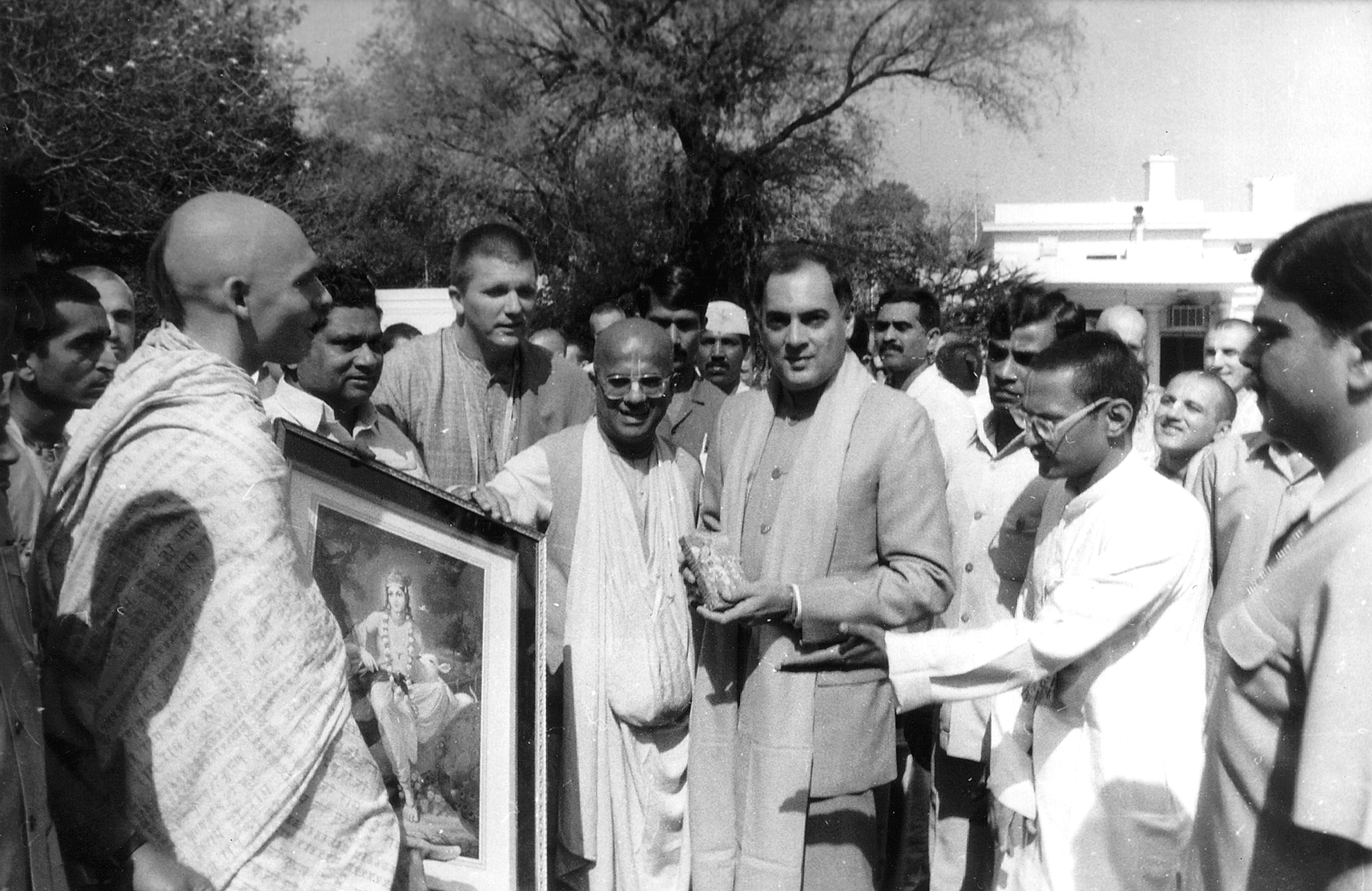
Indian Prime Minister Rajiv Gandhi receiving a Russian copy of the Bhagavad Gita As It Is from Soviet Hare Krishna followers. Delhi (India), 1989.

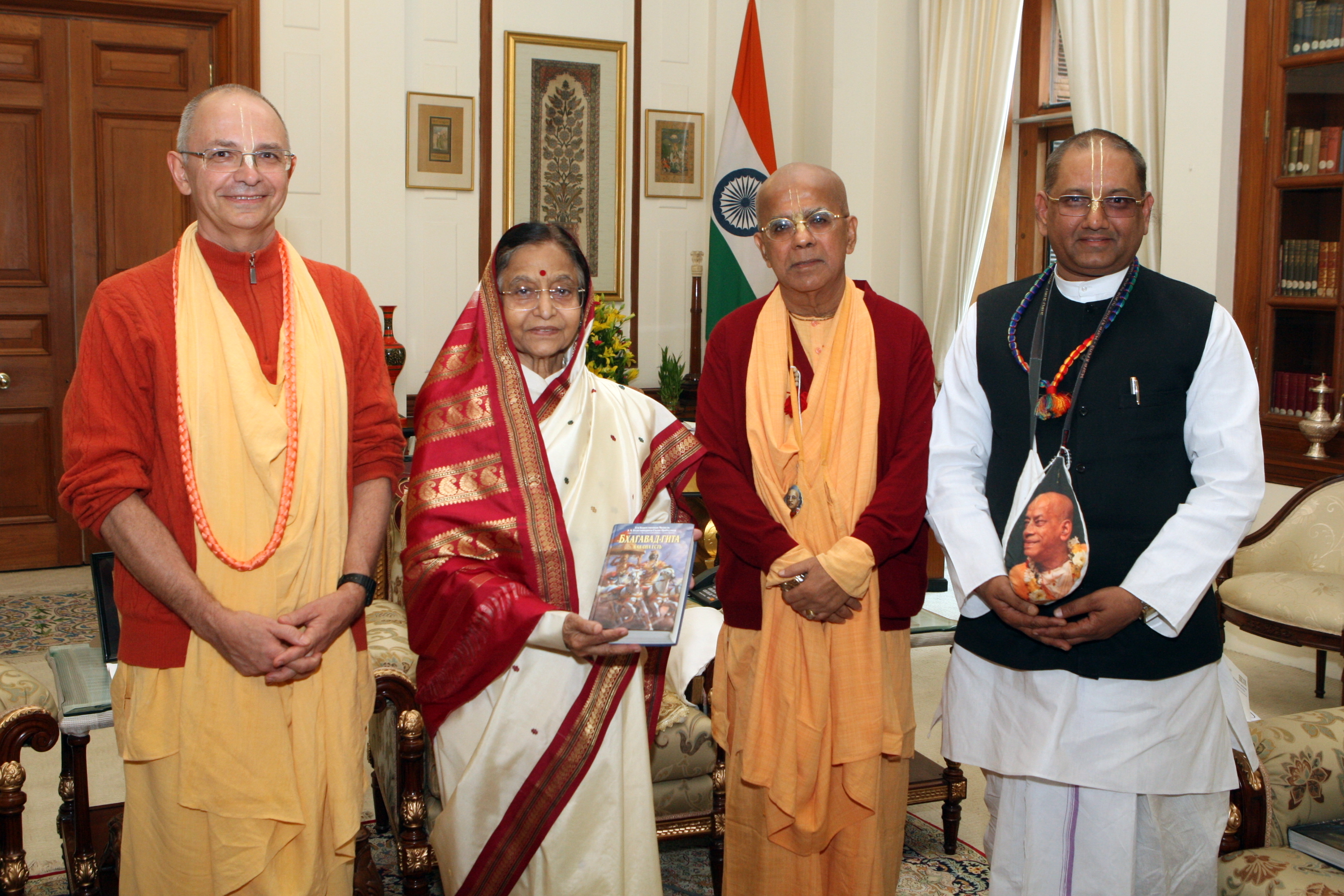
President of India Pratibha Patil receiving a Russian copy of Bhagavad Gita As It Is from ISKCON leaders Bhakti Vijnana Goswami (first from left) and Gopal Krishna Goswami (third from left). New Delhi, February 2011

Bhagavad Gita As It Is is a Russian version of the International Society for Krishna Consciousness (ISKCON) founder A. C. Bhaktivedanta Swami Prabhupada's translation and commentaries on the Bhagavad Gita, a revered scripture for nearly one billion Hindus. The book, a central scripture for Hare Krishna followers, was first published by the Bhaktivedanta Book Trust in 1968 and has been translated into 80 languages, with over 100 million copies distributed globally till date. According to scholars, the book has never been accused of fomenting extremism before. According to ISKCON, in 2004 and 2005 Moscow state prosecutors found no extremism in the previous edition Bhagavad Gita As It Is, which had only slight stylistic differences from the one on trial.

Bhagavad Gita As It Is was presented to a number of world leaders, including the British Prime Minister David Cameron, who said that he "keeps a copy of the book in his office." Indian Ambassador to Russia Ajay Malhotra said that Prabhupada's translation of the Gita "is one of the best that you can find, because he gives you the words, the meanings and the options to understand it as it was written". In November 2011, President of India Pratibha Patil in a message to ISKCON Russia for its 40th anniversary commended the organization for "an important role in popularising the noble and eternal message of the Srimad Bhagavad Gita and promoting spiritual harmony in many foreign lands".

The Bhagavad Gita As It Is trial follows prohibition of a number of publications by groups such as the Jehovah's Witnesses and the Church of Scientology.

== Court case ==
The court case was filed in June 2011 by the public prosecutor of Tomsk Victor Fyodotov. The prosecutor based his plea on an expert analysis of the Bhagavad Gita As It Is commissioned by the FSB. Its authors, three professors of Tomsk State University, Sergei Avanesov, Valery Svistunov, and Valery Naumov, concluded that Bhaktivedanta Swami's commentaries on the Bhagavad Gita contain "signs of fomenting religious hatred, denigration of human dignity on grounds of gender, race, nationality, language, origins, and religious conviction", claim exclusiveness of the Krishna religion, use derogatory terms against those who were not devotees of Krishna, and foster "social discord", "gender, race, nationality, and language" discrimination. In addition to this, it was alleged to contain "calls to hostile, violent actions against a number of social and religious groups".

The prosecutor thus charged the book as being in violation of the Federal law № 114-ФЗ ("On countering extremist activities") and petitioned the court to include Bhagavad Gita As It Is in the Federal List of Extremist Materials, which would ban its printing, possession, and distribution. The Federal List contains over 1,000 works, Hitler's Mein Kampf among them, considered as fomenting ethnic, social, and religious hatred. (Note: Since the collapse of the Soviet Union, the Russian state has had problems with populist right wing movements, often organised on nationalist bases. As part of an attempt to reduce this, a Federal List of Extremist Materials is maintained. Texts such as Hitler's Mein Kampf have been added to the list, due to their use by right wing movements. (Williams, Christopher; Hanson, Stephen (1999). Sabrina P Ramet (ed.). National-Socialism, Left Patriotism, or Superimperialism? The 'Radical Right' in Russia. The radical right in central and eastern Europe since 1989. Post-Communist Cultural Studies. University Park, Pennsylvania: Pennsylvania State University press. pp. 257–278. ISBN 978-0-271-01811-9.))

=== First, second, and third hearings (August 2011) ===
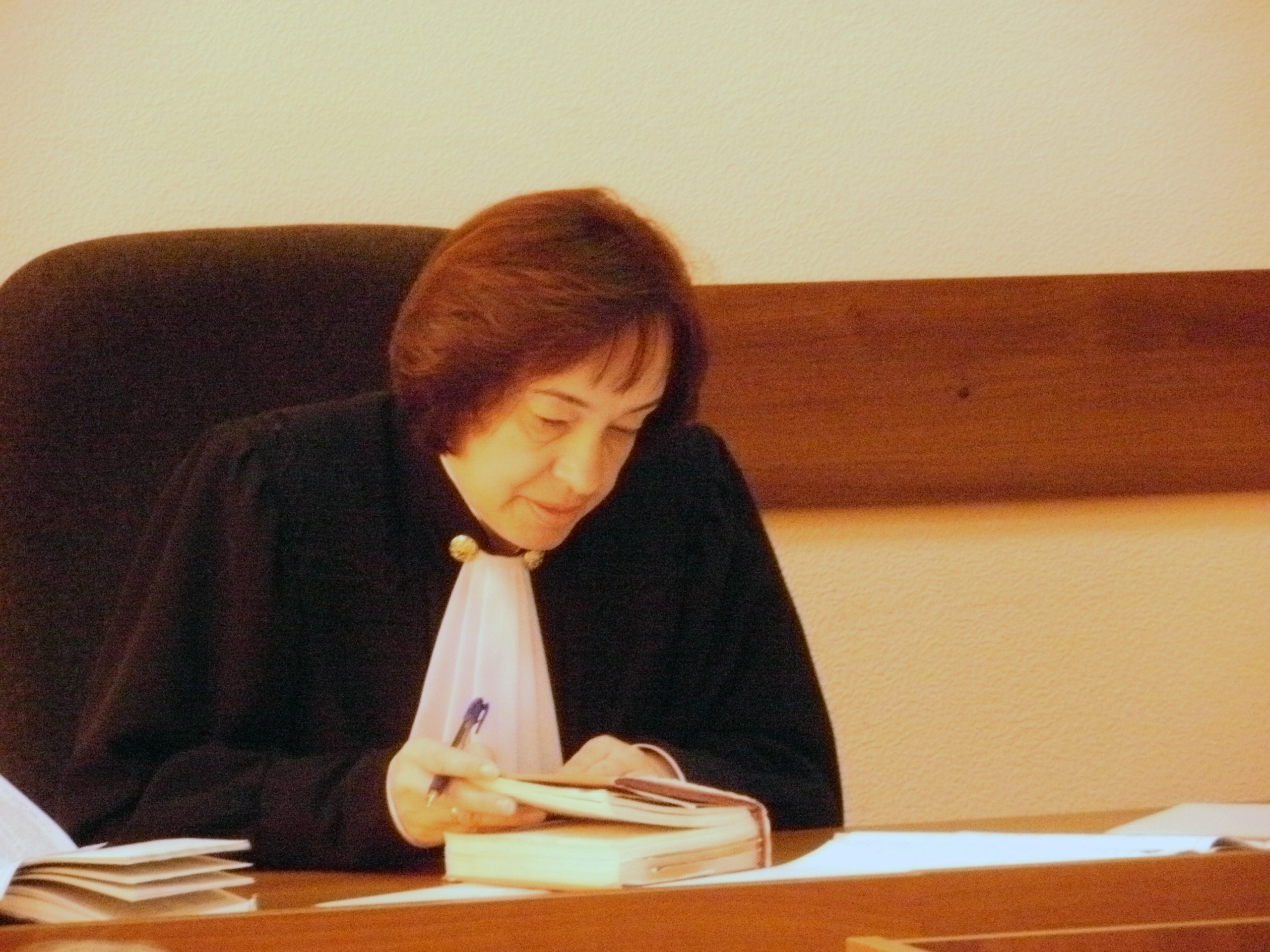
Federal Judge Galina Butenko studies a copy of the Bhagavad Gita As It Is during the first court hearing. August 12, 2011.

In the first, second, and third court hearings held on 12, 18, and 29–30 August 2011 respectively, Federal Judge Galina Butenko dismissed the assessment as inadequate and subjective after the prosecutor's experts said that their opinion in the assessment should be taken as private rather than official. According to Avanesov, the 2010 expert analysis was personally requested by Federal Security officer Dmitry Velikotsky. They also stated that the Bhagavad Gita As It Is did not contain any extremist statements. Two experts invited by the court, N. V. Serebrennikov (Tomsk) and N. N. Karpitsky (Tomsk), also rejected the written expert opinion, maintaining, that while Prabhupada's commentaries used abusive words for those who are not Krishna's devotees, the use of these words did not attempt to create a racial or religious divide, to which the Judge recalled that similarly emotionally charged statements are found in the Bible, like: "Don't throw pearls before swine". The court noted that, despite some claims of exclusiveness in Prabhupada's commentaries, such statements are characteristic of most religious texts and therefore posed no evidence to support the accusations made against the book.

The judge consequently postponed the next hearing until December 2011, as the prosecution requested a new assessment of the book by a panel of three professors of Kemerovo State University, including linguist Michael Osadchy, psychologist Sergei Dranishnikov, and religious studies expert Alexei Gorbatov. They were divided on the issue: two found signs of extremism in the text and one did not. Following a plea by ISKCON advocate Mikhail Fralov to seek a statement of the Russian Human Rights Committee on the Bhagavad Gita As It Is and on the right of religious minorities, the Judge agreed to hear their opinion and postponed the final verdict until 28 December 2011.

=== Fourth hearing and judgement (December 2011) ===
On 28 December 2011, Federal Judge Galina Butenko rejected the prosecutor's plea for a ban of the Bhagavad Gita As It Is. The court's resolution stated that the main criterion for classifying any text as an extremist one is the presence of calls for extremist actions and justifications for such actions, and that the propaganda of exclusiveness found in the book and criticism of political, ideological, and religious convictions is not sufficient grounds for classifying it as such.

The decision received wide coverage by the international media.

=== Appeal (March 2012) ===
On 26 January 2012, the Tomsk prosecutor's office appealed the court's refusal to declare the Russian Bhagavad Gita As It Is an extremist text in a superior court, insisting that the book should be banned, and asking for more time.

The prosecutors insisted that the Russian translation of the book be banned as "extremist literature." The appeal quoted Russian Foreign Ministry spokesman Alexander Lukashevich questioning the translated version, the authenticity of its linguistics as they relate to Hindu scripture, and "semantic distortions."

The prosecutor general for Tomsk Vasily Voikin said, "When we have to deal with such materials, we are just bound to proceed with them. The law opposes extremism. When scholars say the text is of an extremist character, we just have to respond". The appeal was scheduled for hearing by the Tomsk regional court on 6 March 2012 but was later rescheduled for 20 March.

On 16 February 2012, explaining the rationale behind the appeal, first deputy prosecutor general of Russia Alexander Buksman said in an interview during his visit to Tomsk that the public misunderstood the initial plea of prosecutor's office to have the Bhagavad Gita As It Is declared an extremist text. He stated that the prosecutor’s office sought a ban of the Russian version of the book’s commentaries rather than on the Hindu text itself, adding, "it’s important to discern gems from the chatter in this very case; the society’s perception of this issue is that prosecutors are standing against the concepts of this religion [Hinduism]. However, the problem is that the Russian translation has paragraphs that could be seen as promoting extremism; prosecutors started the case for that reason." Deputy prosecutor general of Russian in Siberia region Ivan Semchishyn confirmed, "That is why the prosecutor now has to stand up for his position in the appellate court".

On 21 February 2012, at a press conference at the Interfax office in Tomsk, anti-cult activist Alexander Dvorkin stated that the "manifesto book of the Krishna Consciousness Society, Bhagavad Gita As It Is, is not immediately related to the original, being a free and not quite skilled translation."

In response to the appeal, the Vishwa Hindu Parishad (VHP), along with the International Society for Krishna Consciousness (ISKCON), stated that they would fight "internationally" against any threats to ban the Bhagavad Gita in Russia.

=== Dismissal of appeal (March 2012) ===
Representative of the prosecution said that the district court incorrectly interpreted the definition of "extremism" when it claimed that it is necessary for it to contain calls to extremist activity which must be expressed in any kind of actions, pointing out that the law prohibits all propaganda that incites any kind of hatred.

On 21 March 2012, the appeal court upheld the decision of the lower court, rejecting the prosecutor's petition. On 29 May 2012, Tomsk regional prosecutor Vasily Voykin said that the prosecutor's office will no further appeal the court's refusal to declare Bhagavad Gita As It Is extremist.

== Reaction to the trial ==
=== In India ===
==== Media ====
Since 17 December 2011, when Indo-Asian News Service (IANS) issued a report by a staff writer Nallan Chakravarthi Bipindra (NC Bipindra) from Moscow about the proposed Bhagavad Gita ban in Russia, the event became breaking news in the Indian printed and electronic media, with over 600 publications, including editorials, in all major newspapers and TV news channels as of 27 December 2011.

==== Parliament ====
On 19 December 2011, Bhartruhari Mahtab, leader of the Biju Janata Dal party, raised up the issue of the Bhagavad Gita trial in the Indian Parliament (Lok Sabha), demanding to know what the Indian government was undertaking to protect "the religious rights of Hindus in Russia". He also called on the government to "impress [this] upon the Russian authorities through diplomatic channels". The House Speaker Meira Kumar then turned down requests for speeches on the topic and had to adjourn the session amid protests against the ban of the Gita sparked by Mahtab's statement, as angry members of the Parliament across the party lines strongly condemned the ban, shouting: "We will not tolerate an insult to Lord Krishna!" The issue was simultaneously raised in Rajya Sabha (the Upper House). This display of political unity surprised the media and prompted a Rajya Sabha member to call the 19 December parliamentary session "a golden day in our history when all differences were deleted to express solidarity for Gita, the book of India".

On 20 December, Sushma Swaraj, leader of the largest opposition party BJP demanded that the Indian government declare the Bhagavad Gita a "national book". Her move seconded by a BJP member of Rajya Sabha, Tarun Vijay, who asked rhetorically "Can sun be banned, Himalayas be banned ...?" Members across party lines voiced their support. Deputy Chairman of the Rajya Sabha K. Rahman Khan, member of the Indian National Congress, said "the entire house agrees with this and joins in condemning this".

On 21 December, a Bharatiya Janata Party delegation led by the party's foreign affairs chief Vijay Jolly met with the Deputy Chief of the Russian Mission in Delhi Denis Alipov to express the party's "pain and anguish" at the Bhagavad Gita trial and demand that "suitable measures" be taken by the Russian government to immediately dismiss the court case as baseless. Jolly also expressed surprise that the Russian government allowed the trial to continue for over half a year despite the fact that "India–Russia relations is of paramount importance to both countries". The delegation also sent through the Russian embassy a copy of the Bhagavad Gita to President of Russia Dmitry Medvedev along with a letter, in which the BJP delegation stressed to the Russian President that the Gita is a book of "sublime thoughts" that "preaches self discipline ... promotes spiritualism and teaches to the mankind the need to fulfill responsibility towards worldly duties".

==== Government ====
According to officials of the Prime Minister of India's office, "[t]his matter is receiving the highest attention and the Indian embassy officials in Moscow have been instructed to follow up the case with the Russian authorities", in order to either have the case withdrawn by the state or resolved. Minister of State for Parliamentary Affairs Rajeev Shukla said that the Indian authorities are "apprising the Russian government" on the issue. However, members of the Parliament accused the Indian government of inaction. They said that on 1 November, ISKCON informed Prime Minister Manmohan Singh's principal secretary Pulok Chatterji of the impending court case, urging the government to use "some high-level ministerial visits" to Moscow, prior to the Prime Minister's own visit 15–17 December, to protect the scripture from legal action. The letter, written by ISKCON's Governing Body Commissioner Gopala Krishna Goswami, cited the assessment as stating that "Krishna is evil and not compatible with Christian views". Despite the advance notice, which was also sent to the United Progressive Alliance (UPA) chairperson Sonia Gandhi, Commerce and Industry Minister Anand Sharma, and the External Affairs Minister S. M. Krishna, the issue was not discussed with the Russian government during the following six official visits of Indian ministers and top officials to Moscow. Officials who were part of the delegation accompanying the Prime Minister confirmed receipt of the letter to the Indo-Asian News Service.

==== Ministry of External Affairs ====
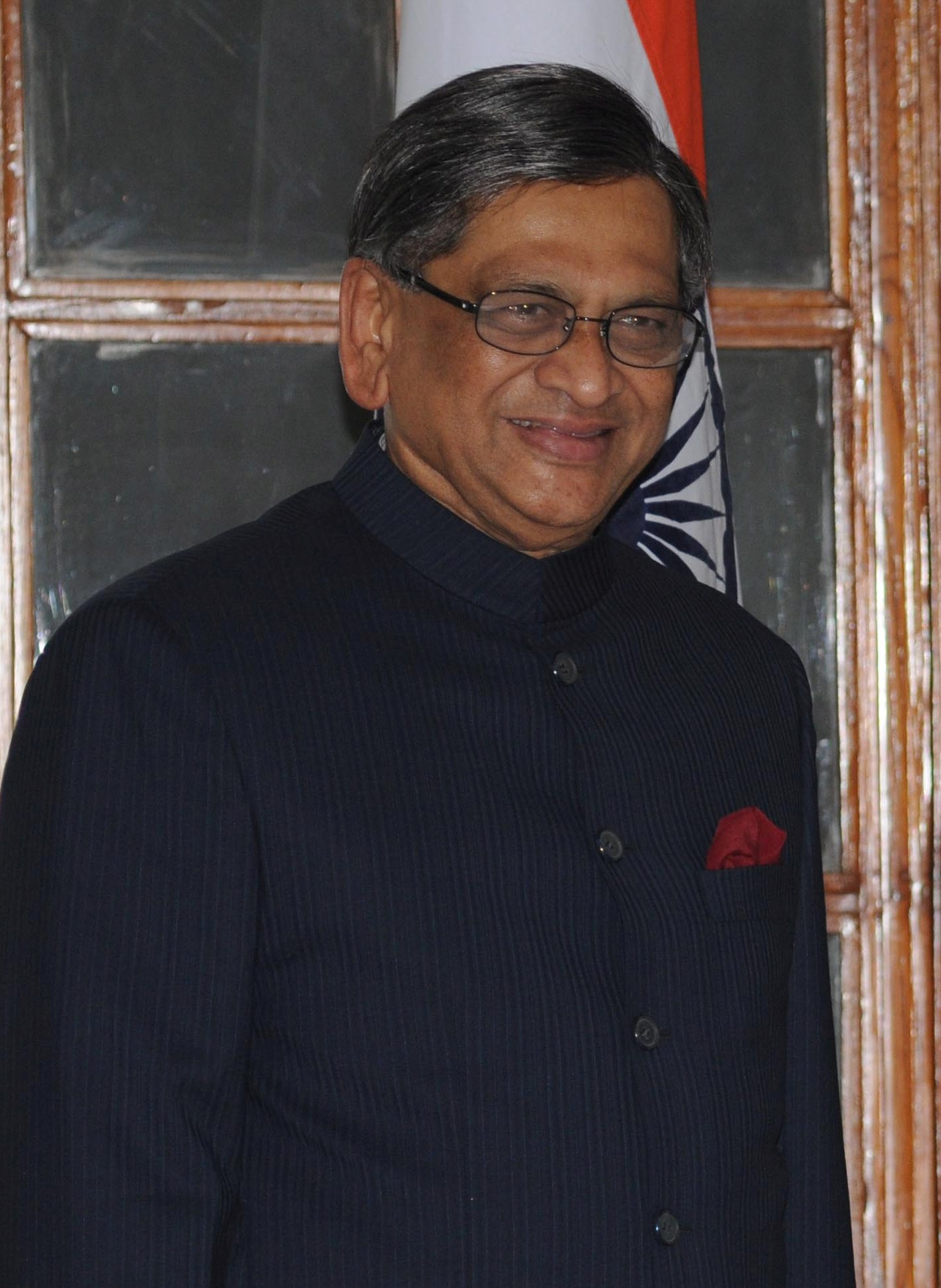
Indian Foreign Minister S. M. Krishna.

Following the Parliament's demand for a report from the External Affairs Ministry on the issue, Foreign Minister S. M. Krishna said that ISKCON had been advised to take legal recourse and put the controversy in the light of Russia-India relations. He also stated in Lok Sabha that "the Bhagavad-gita is the definitive treatise of Indian thought." He welcomed the judgement and thanked the Russian government for its support.

==== High Court ====
On 21 December, the High Court of Mumbai questioned the Indian government as to the measures it is undertaking to intervene in the possible ban of the Bhagavad Gita and directed the government to consider representing the position of India on the issue before the court in Tomsk. The High Court decision came in response to a Public Interest Litigation filed by two local activists charging the Indian government with inaction in regard to informing the Russian court of the actual purport of the Bhagavad Gita, and that the Indian Embassy's "monitoring the matter closely" was not sufficient. The court observed Indian Foreign Minister S. M. Krishna's Parliament statement does not imply if Indian government's direct involvement with the 28 December Bhagavad Gita trial hearing and asked the government to submit its reply on the steps taken by 9 January.

==== Religious groups ====
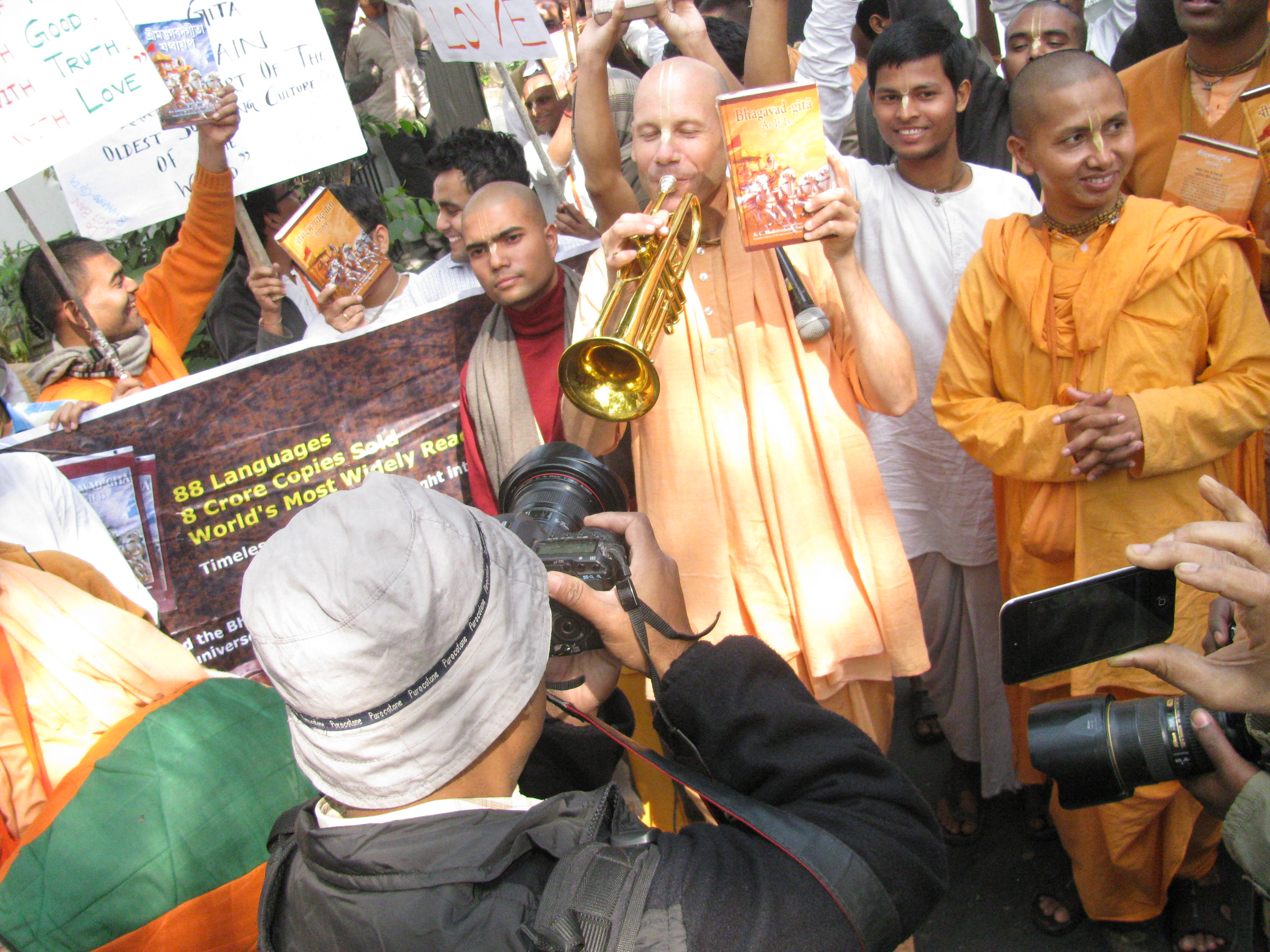
ISKCON devotees rallying in front of the Russian Consulate in Kolkata (India) demanding to stop the Bhagavad Gita As It Is trial. 19 December 2011

On 19 December, dozens of ISKCON followers organized a rally in front of the Russian Consulate in Kolkata, holding up copies of the Bhagavad Gita As It Is in various languages and demanding to stop persecution of their most important scripture. Similar protest marches were held in New Delhi and Chandigarh. Gopal Krishna Goswami, ISKCON's Governing Body Commissioner for India, said that ISKCON members are poised to intensify their public protests across the globe if their scripture is banned. He said, "I hope the Indian government will be able to pressurize the Russian government and the matter gets solved legally. It's a book of peace and there's nothing extreme in it. Holy scriptures shouldn't be taken to court".

On 21 December, a highly respected Islamic seminary Darul Uloom Deoband issued a statement signed by its vice-chancellor Abul Qasim Nomani in defense of the Bhagavad Gita, in which he condemned "Russian diktat against the Hindu holy scripture". Nomani also called accusations of the Gita of extremism "totally baseless and highly objectionable", maintaining that the proposed ban is tantamount to violation of the freedom of conscience "enshrined" in the Indian Constitution, and called on boldly countering the "Russian highhandedness". Maulana Khalid Rashid, head of Firangi Mahal, another Islamic center of higher education in Lucknow, also condemned what he called "Russian arrogance" and called on Muslims to support Hindu followers while appealing to the Indian government "to take a firm stance so that such blasphemous interference is not attempted in future".

On 22 December 2011, Isai Mahasangh organization representing Christians in the Indian state of Madhya Pradesh addressed the President of India Pratibha Patil and the Pope Benedict XVI, asking for their intervention in the Bhagavad Gita trial. An Isai Mahasangh delegation conveyed their memorandum to the President through Madhya Pradesh governor Ram Naresh Yadav, and to the Pope through the Holy See embassy in New Delhi. Jerry Paul, General Secretary of Isai Mahasangh, stated that it was clear from the court case against the Gita that "the Russians are not aware of the importance of the Gita, the teachings and values it upholds and above all its place in the life of millions of Indians".

A prominent Hindu teacher Sri Sri Ravi Shankar in his Twitter called the proposed ban of the Bhagavad Gita in Russia "an unpardonable loss for the people of Russia" and, countering accusations of the book of "extremism" and "intolerance" opined that it was the move to ban the scripture that showed intolerance and bred terrorism rather than the Gita's teachings.

==== Hindu activists ====
On 20 December 2011, the Vishwa Hindu Parishad (VHP) threatened to protest outside Russian missions in India if Russia effects the ban. VHP General Secretary Pravin Togadia said in a statement that the Bhagavad Gita is held sacred by all Hindus and that its principles have universal appeal and "touch humanity so very deeply", citing Albert Einstein's fascination with the book as an example. Togadia also warned Russian authorities that Indians will be forced to boycott Russian goods, plants, and offices in India in response to the Gita ban in Russia. A group of VHP members held a protest march in front of the Russian consulate in Mumbai. VHP and Bajrang Dal activists also staged protest in Chandigarh, calling on the Indian government to protect the rights of Hindus in Russia and denouncing the proposed ban. On 23 December, dozens of activists of Rashtrawadi Sena, a hardline Hindu group, burned a Russian flag and shouted anti-Russian slogans during a protest march in New Delhi over the proposed ban. Rashtrawadi Sena president Jai Bhagwan Goyal called the Gita "the most pious book of the nation" and said there will be no tolerance for insulting it. The protesters also sent a memorandum to Indian President Pratibha Patil, and to the Russian embassy, demanding to avert the ban. They also urged the President to declare the Bhagavad Gita a "national scripture" in order to prevent such insults in the future. A similar protest along with the burning of a Russian flag was held on 26 December by activists of the right-wing Hindu organisation Shiv Sena in Amritsar. In a similar move, a Jammu unit of Sri Ram Sena appealed to Indian and Russian authorities to forestall the impending Gita ban "for the betterment of Indo-Russia relations".

==== Atheists and rationalists ====
Sanal Edamaruku, the president of the Indian Rationalist Association, opposed the ban calling for the right to read any literature under the freedom of expression, even if he considered the book to be promoting the caste system. Similarly, Dr Jayagopal, the founder of the Atheist Society of India, opposed the ban, in spite of considering the book to be undemocratic and against the spirit of the constitution. He also suspected that the Russian Orthodox Church may have been behind the ban. Megh Raj Mitter, the founder of the Tarksheel Society, also opposed this move, but admitted that Russians may have been offended by the book and their sentiments should be respected.

On the other hand, Dalit Marxist scholar Chittibabu Padavala supported the ban, as he considered Gita to be promoting inequalities from birth unlike other religious texts.

==== Russian community in Goa ====
On 21 December 2011, the Russian community in Goa has issued a statement condemning the proposed ban on the Bhagavad Gita in Russia. Speaking on behalf of the 150-strong community, Russian consulate in Goa Vikram Varma stated: "The Russian community in Goa as a whole condemns the possibility of a ban on any of India's ancient scriptures. It is felt by the Russian community in Goa as well as by a large section of Russians visiting Goa that the depth of knowledge and wisdom offered by the Bhagavad Gita cannot be understood by a casual reader. It is well accepted that all the ancient Hindu scriptures are of tremendous importance not only to India but to the rest of the world."

==== Society ====
The trial sparked community protests in India. On 16 December 2011, an online petition to stop the Bhagavad Gita trial was launched, and by 22 December more than 45,000 people from all over the world, mostly from India.

The topic has gone viral on social networks, with the hashtag #Gita becoming a leading trend on Indian Twitter. Noted poet and lyricist Javed Akhtar, for instance, twitted: "Banning Gita ? Have they lost their minds. This great book of wisdom belongs not only to Hindus but to the whole humanity". Member of Parliament Naveen Jindal wrote in his blog, "I welcome the statement by the Russian ambassador to India condemning the Bhagavad Gita controversy". Janata Dal party leader Subramanian Swamy wrote on Twitter: "Happy to inform that Russian Ambassador will tell my daughter on TV that he is a student of Gita and Russia will rectify matters soon. Ok?" and Bollywood celebrity Farah Khan suggested in a retweet: "The Russians have banned the Gita. In retaliation let's ban something equally sacrosanct to them: vodka".

Prominent social activists from a broad societal spectrum also condemned the trial. A vocal anti-fundamentalist Ram Puniyani of the EKTA Committee for Communal Amity called the move to ban the Bhagavad Gita translation "irrational", suggesting that possible questionable passages should be analyzed and debated, but they do not warrant the legal action. Former president of the Students Islamic Movement of India Shahid Badr Falahi said he was "completely against" this or any other bans of religious books, calling on "equal opinion on issues pertaining to every religion". Ram Madhav, national executive member of the Rashtriya Swayamsevak Sangh termed the attempted ban "a shameful act" planned by some "fundamentalist groups in Russia" to portray the Bhagavad Gita as a "terror manual". He emphasized the Gita's status as one of the most sacred texts respected in all religions and expressed hope that the Russian government will help stop the trial.

=== In Russia ===
The Russian society appears to be embarrassed by the court case over the Gita, with the media mostly condemning the ongoing trial, carrying reports titled like "Trial of Indian book brings shame to Tomsk". A prominent Russian Internet paper Gazeta.ru published a satirical article on how a work that was created 5,000 years ago has suddenly become an extremist document.

==== Indian diaspora and ISKCON ====
Hare Krishna followers, who count over 100,000 members and over 100 centers in Russia, expressed fear that the trial on their main scripture, if upheld by the court, will be followed by a ban of their entire movement and religion nationwide. The 15,000-strong Hindu community in Russia shared the apprehension. On 1 November, ISKCON leader in India Gopal Krishna Goswami appealed to the Indian government asking to intervene and resolve the impending trial by bringing it up with the Russian authorities during Indian official visits to Moscow. Hindu followers in Russia from India, Bangladesh, Mauritius, Nepal and other countries held an emergency meeting, at which they set up the Hindu Council of Russia meant to protect their interests in Russia, and elected Sadhu Priya Das, and India-born member of ISKCON, as its chairman. Das said that they were seeking opinion of the Russian Ombudsman and experts from Moscow and St. Petersburg, the main centers of Indology in Russia, and that they trusted the Russian judiciary, hoping that "finally the truth will prevail".

ISKCON members alleged that the court case was instigated by the Russian Orthodox Church in order to limit their activities in Russia.

==== Scholars ====
On 28 November, at a round table organized by Russian newspaper Moskovskij Komsomolets, scientists and members of the Russian Academy of Sciences along with a few religious leaders stated in a resolution, "there is no basis for conducting such a trial and the very fact of initiating a trial by the public prosecutor is an insult to the religious feelings of followers of Vaishnavism in India and Russia and it will give a body blow to Indo-Russian relations."

Sergey Serebryanny, the head of the Institute of High Humanitarian Studies at the Russian State University for the Humanities and an Indologist, said Russian courts give the term ‘extremism’ a very broad interpretation, which allows them to label as extremist anything going against the authorities, whether secular or religious. He also opined that, while Prabhupada supplemented his version of the Bhagavad Gita with his own ideas and beliefs, his followers "have the same right for the freedom of conscience as believers of other religious confessions that observe the laws of the Russian Federation".

Russian Indologist Yevgenia Vanina of the Institute of Oriental Studies of the Russian Academy of Sciences wrote an article severely criticizing the court case over the Bhagavad Gita, which "is revered by millions in India, Nepal, Sri Lanka and wherever Hindus live". She reminded that in Europe, the Gita was "admired by many great philosophers and thinkers, such as Herder, Schopenhauer and Tolstoy" and thought it ironic that while the Hindu scripture was first translated into Russian in 1788, "nobody put the book and its translators on trial in the Orthodox Russian Empire in 1788, but it’s being judged in secular democratic Russia". Vanina also argued that charges of extremism against Prabhupada's "copious" commentaries on the Bhagavad Gita are fallacious and based on a "primitive" screening of the religious text for negative words (such as "fool," "enemy," "demon", "kill"). According to Vanina, using this approach, any ancient text, from the Greek myths to the Bible, and the Koran, can be found extremism, especially when "specialists in philosophical suicidology are entrusted with passing judgement on ancient Indian texts". Vanina concluded by opining that, despite people's right to their attitudes towards "a Russian lad wearing Indian clothes and singing Hare Krishna", ISKCON followers have the right to practice their religion, and that the Russian Orthodox Church, instead of calling for a ban on competitors or attempting to legally equate their holy book to Mein Kampf, should introspect as to the reasons that deter young Russians from joining the Church. Otherwise, Vanina predicted, "people will again start being burned alive".

Historian and full professor of the Diplomatic Academy at the Ministry of Foreign Affairs of Russia Andrey Volodin opined that the move to ban the Gita was "contrary to the basic principle of tolerance inherent in Russian civilisation". He said that this trial, held in Tomsk, "one of Russia’s intellectual capitals, raises doubts as to whether the local leaders are sane and the intellectual community in one of the country’s main academic and university centers is actually mature". To a question, which forces in Russia are interested in a ban on the Bhagavad Gita Volodin replied that "all the intelligence services in the world, including the CIA and MI6, could never have come up with a more effective move to compromise Russia in India and in the world".

==== Government ====
In an interview by CNN-IBN, Russia's ambassador to India Alexander Kadakin called Bhagavad Gita "the source of wisdom and inspiration not only for the people of India but for Russia as well and the world." and commended the Indian Parliament and government for their resolute stance on the Bhagavad Gita trial in Russia, opining that both countries nations, being secular, democratic, and multi-confessional, "should not allow such things to happen". He assured that the Russian government is using all means to end the Bhagavad Gita scandal and added that he thought it "categorically inadmissible" to take any sacred scriptures "for examination to ignorant people" to the courts rather than to academic forums. Kadakin ruled out the possibility of the Russian government directly influencing the court decision, but added that the government still "can do something" and called the instigators of the trial "madmen", whose "madness should be stopped." He also answered a question of a possible apology to the people of India by the Russian government, opining that since it was not the Russian government who started the case, it "has nothing to apologize for, [but] can only testify and reiterate the love and affection and highest esteem our nation has for Bhagvat Gita."

On 27 December 2011, after a meeting with the Foreign Minister of India S. M. Krishna, at which Krishna reiterated India's grave concerns over the issue, Kadakin told reporters that the Russian government will do everything within its powers to prevent the ban. He said that, while it was a judicial process, the Russian government can ask the people of Russia "to express our love and admiration for the Gita, ... that [assurance] you can get from anyone in Russia". He also added that he had read the Gita and thought it was a great scripture of the world, and maintained that "no holy scripture, whether it is Bible, Quran or Gita, can be brought to a court".

According to the Minister of State for Parliamentary Affairs Rajeev Shukla, a top Russian minister also "expressed regrets" about the situation.

Russian Chief Director for Human Rights Vladimir Lukin stated that the attempt to ban Bhagavad Gita As It Is amounted to "infringement on the constitutional right to the freedom of consciousness" and that it was "unacceptable" to ban the Bhagavad Gita As It Is written by ISKCON founder Bhaktivedanta Swami Prabhupada, in Russia, as he said it was a "globally respected book". As the Ombudsman for Russia, Vladimir Lukun took the Bhagavad Gita court case under his special control and will testify in the court on 28 December asking to dismiss the charges.

At a 22 December 2011 press briefing, Russian Foreign Ministry spokesman Alexander Lukashevich attempted to clarify a number of points seemingly misunderstood by his Indian colleagues: "In June this year Tomsk prosecutors instigated legal proceedings against the third edition of the Russian translation of 'Bhagavad Gita As It Is' with a view to have it added to the federal list of extremist materials. I would like to stress that the trial is not about 'Bhagavad Gita', a religious philosophical poem, which forms part of the great Indian epic Mahabharata and is one of the most famous texts of the ancient Hindu literature. In Russia, the book was first published in Russian in 1788 and then went through many editions in different years and in various translations. The Tomsk court case is about classifying as extremist material the Russian-language edition of 'Bhagavad Gita As It Is', written in 1968 by A. C. Bhaktivedanta Swami Prabhupada, founder of the International Society for Krishna Consciousness. The work represents an authorized translation of the original from Sanskrit into English. The book was translated into Russian in 1984. As evident from the materials available, the complaints of law enforcement are not so much about the text of the book itself, whose double translation suffers from semantic distortions, as about the author's comments which were regarded as falling under Article 13 of the Federal Law 'On Counteracting Extremist Activity'."

Nelly Krechetova, Human Rights Ombudsman of Tomsk region, has termed the trial "absurd". Speaking on the Echo of Moscow radio station, she said, "This book is considered sacred by more than a billion people the world over, and in Russia itself the book has been in circulation for 20 years." She continued that there was no manifest incident of extremism caused by the dissemination of the book. A ban on the book, she said, would amount to "violation of constitutional rights of citizens to freedom of conscience and faith."

=== International ===
Associated Press reported that the attempt to ban Bhagavad Gita As It Is angered Hindus around the world.

The court case evoked protests by US-based Hindu activists, who called the trial "an attack on religious freedom and belittling of the entire Hindu community." The Hindu American Foundation (HAF) based in Washington, DC expressed "shock and outrage" over the attempted ban. Subhag Shukla, HAF managing director, called the move by Russian prosecutors "indefensible" and "a draconian attempt to restrict the religious freedom of Hindus in Russia". Shukla added that, "[b]y promoting a narrow and intolerant agenda that demonizes a sacred scripture revered by more than one billion Hindus worldwide, Russian officials are acting contrary to the principles of a free democratic society". HAF members conveyed their concerns in an official statement to the Russian embassy in Washington, DC, requesting a follow-up meeting to monitor the situation, and urged the Russian judiciary and government "to uphold the basic rights of their Hindu citizens". They also warned that "Any court ruling or law that would prohibit the Bhagavad Gita or any other Hindu religious literature would be considered a direct attack on the civil liberties of Russia's Hindu community and an affront to Hindus throughout the world".

In Kathmandu, Nepal, a consortium of the country's Hindu organizations, Rastriya Dharma Sabha Nepal, condemned the proposed ban, urging the government and the Nepalese Parliament to support the Bhagavad Gita. Chairman of the Dharma Sabha Madhav Bhattarai also requested the Parliament to discuss the issue and address it with the Russian government and embassy in Nepal. Another protest was expressed by a Nepali Shreemadbhagawat Publicity Service Association (SPSA), which emphasized that rather than being extremist, the Gita "guides one for the self-discipline and responsibility to human duties" and informed of plans to hold rallies against the potential ban.

The United States Department of State in its annual International Religious Freedom Report for 2011 cited the Bhagavad Gita trial among instances of "selectively enforced existing legal restrictions on religious freedom" by the Russian government. The report quoted the Russian Ombudsperson for Human Rights Vladimil Lukin as saying that "the struggle with terrorism is a struggle with real terrorist planning and creation of groups, not with the interpretation of ancient holy books, of whatever faith".

On 4 December 2025, Prime Minister of India Narendra Modi presented a Russian copy of Prabhupada's Bhagavad-Gita As It Is to the President of Russia Vladimir Putin during Putin's state visit to India, writing in his official X account: "Presented a copy of the Gita in Russian to President Putin. The teachings of the Gita give inspiration to millions across the world." The note added to the gift explained: "Its timeless wisdom inspires ethical living, mind control, and inner peace, with translations making it accessible to modern readers worldwide".

== Reaction to the appeal ==
=== Scholars ===
On 24 February 2012, Russian religious scholars and experts held a nationwide conference Bhagavad Gita in history and modern society at the Tomsk State University. They said they were "perplexed" over the Tomsk prosecutor's office's continued attempts to have the Bhagavad Gita as It Is declared extremist. Chief researcher of the Institute of Oriental Studies of the Russian Academy of Sciences, indologist Irina Glushkova said in an interview with RIA Novosti that there are various schools of Hinduism "and each school is based on its own scripture or commentary", adding that "from this point of view Bhagavad Gita As It Is has the right to exist as any other commentary or scripture. It is a fundamental principle of Hinduism and there is no any other Hinduism whoever says it, Dvorkin or the Tomsk prosecutor's office". She also stated it was "impermissible" to subject the Bhagavad Gita As It Is to a criminal court trial, because "it is inseparable from the original Bhagavad Gita, both being parts of the same culture". Philosopher Tatyana Lyubimova, chief researcher of the Institute of Philosophy of the Russian Academy of Sciences, said that most ancient scriptures, including the Bhagavad Gita, were revised or adapted over the years so that modern people could better understand them.

On 12 March 2012, a group of twenty leading Russian philosophers, orientologists, and philologists published an open letter addressing both Russian President Dmitry Medvedev and the Russian Prime Minister and President-elect Vladimir Putin, with copies sent to Russia's Presecutor General, Ministry of Justice, and Public Chamber, urging the ruling tandem to take the Bhagavad Gita As It Is court case under their "personal control". The scholars said they were alarmed by the Tomsk prosecutor's attempting to overrule the earlier court's rejection of the extremest charges against the book, and filing a modified petition asking the court to ban only Bhaktivedanta Swami's commentaries and exempting the original text from the charges of extremism. The scholars criticized the prosecutor's indictment of the commentaries with extremism as "untrue and contrary to the traditions of Hinduism". They emphasized that, contrary to the prosecutor's accusations, the Bhagavad Gita As It Is was considered sacred by a section of Hindu followers as belonging to the commentary tradition of Bengali Vaishnavism, "one of the most popular branches of Hinduism", and "did not contain any signs of extremism and did not incite hatred on ethnic, religious or any other grounds". The scholars also warned Russia's top leaders that the trial "discredits Russia's cultural and democratic credentials in the eyes of the civilized world and is driving a wedge in Russian-Indian relations".

=== ISKCON ===
Maxim Osipov, a representative of ISKCON's Governing Body Commission, said that the commentary to Bhagavad Gita As It Is is "a precise and clear reflection" on the religious tradition taught by Prabhupada, the founder-acharya of the International Society for Krishna Consciousness.

== Reaction to the court decision ==
=== In India ===
"I welcome the verdict of the Honourable District Court in Tomsk today, which has dismissed the appeal petition in the Bhagavad Gita case. It is good that the decision of the lower trial court in this matter has been reaffirmed. I trust that this issue is now conclusively behind us", said Ajai Malhotra, Indian Ambassador to the Russian Federation.

"We appreciate this sensible resolution of a sensitive issue and are glad to put this episode behind us. We also appreciate the efforts of all friends in Russia who made this outcome possible. This demonstrates yet again that the people of India and Russia have a deep understanding of each other’s cultures and will always reject any attempt to belittle our common civilizational values", said Indian foreign ministry spokesman Vishnu Prakash.

=== In Russia ===
==== Human Rights Commissioner ====
On 11 April 2012 Vladimir Lukin, the Human Rights Commissioner of Russia, "warned against court decisions on Bhagavad Gita texts based on judges' opinions rather than expert examinations." Lukin stated that the "Tomsk [judges] considered something they should not have… It should have been up to theologians and historians." Lukin noted that "Winston Churchill once said: Stupidity is also a gift of God, but one mustn't misuse it."

==== Religions ====
On 28 December 2011, the day the Tomsk court dismissed extremism charges against the Bhagavad Gita As It Is, director of the Human Rights Center of the World Russian People's Council Roman Silantyev said that the examination of the Bhagavad Gita As It Is as extremist was accurate, and that "it has nothing to do with traditional Hinduism."

He also called Krishna devotees in Russia marginal pseudo-Hindu cult members with "extremely nasty reputation" and condemned their charitable food distribution programs saying it was unacceptable for Orthodox, Muslim, Jews and Buddhist believers.

On 18 January 2012, a number of Russia's Islamic leaders denounced Hare Krishna followers in Russia as a "destructive cult" and called on the Russian authorities not to yield to the Indian pressure in regard of the proposed banning of the Bhagavad Gita As It is. Mufti Muhammedgali Huzin, head of All-Russian Muslim Board executive committee, said, "I believe that Russian authorities should be principally tough in the question and shouldn't give way to any provocations and pressure. I think that Russia can do without semiliterate interpretations of ancient epos". First deputy chairman of the Central Spiritual Board of Russian Muslims Mufti of Moscow and Russia's Central Region Albir Krganov proposed to "pay the debt" to Krishna devotees in Russia for their charitable food distribution by "delivering nutritious Halal canned beef to starving Krishna devotees of India. We are ready to personally distribute this meat to Russian Krishnaites". However, other all-Russia Islamic umbrella organizations rejected their statements as "fortunately" not representing the opinion of a majority of Russian Muslims of the issue.

On 27 January 2012, a group of Russian Orthodox Christian activists entered the premises of the Moscow Krishna temple and tried to hand the temple authorities a box of canned beef. The group claimed that their action was in retaliation for the burning of the Russian flag in India by Hindu fundamentalists protesting the proposed ban of the Bhagavad Gita As It Is, which they called an "anti-Russian … disgraceful act" and "one of the steps in the unprecedented campaign of pressing on Russian court".

On 31 January 2012, the head of the Traditional Buddhist Sangha of Russia Andrey Baljirov called the Indian authorities who asked the Russian government to help avert the proposed ban of the Bhagavad Gita As It Is "misinformed" and "exerting pressure" and spoke against the proposed construction of the Krishna temple in Moscow because "there are Buddhist followers in Moscow who do not have a temple yet".

== See also ==
- Federal List of Extremist Materials
- Freedom of the press in the Russian Federation
- Controversy over construction of a Hindu temple in Moscow
- Frivolous litigation
