= Sadhu Priya Das =

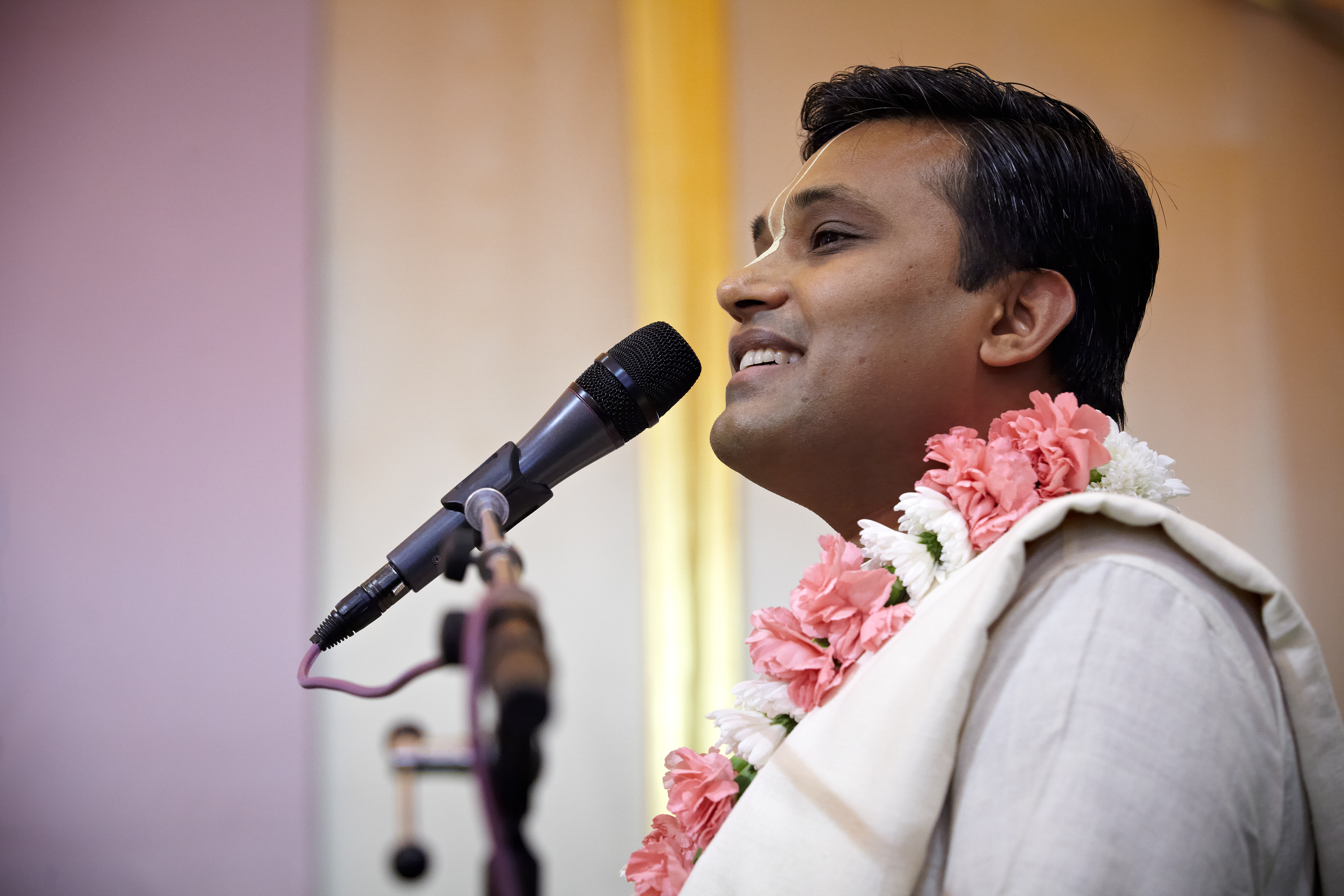

Sadhu Priya Das (also known as Sanjeet Kumar Jha) is the Moscow-based chairman of the Hindu Council of Russia and an Indian-born member of the International Society for Krishna Consciousness (ISKCON). He played an active role in the Bhagavad Gita court case filed in 2011 by the prosecutor's office in Tomsk, Russia, advocating the authenticity of Bhagavad Gita As It Is, an ISKCON translation of the Bhagavad Gita. As the president of the Association of Indians in Russia, Das was a vocal supporter of religious rights of Hare Krishna followers in Russia and Turkmenistan. Das was also a major sponsor and chairman of the board of directors of the Bhaktivedanta Gurukula, a Moscow Hare Krishna school teaching a curriculum that combined classes on ancient Indian literature and philosophy, Sanskrit and traditional South Asian instruments with the educational standards of Russia.
