= Chaitanya Chandra Charan Das =

Religious activist

- चैतन्य चंद्र चरण दास; Чайтанья Чандра Чаран Дас
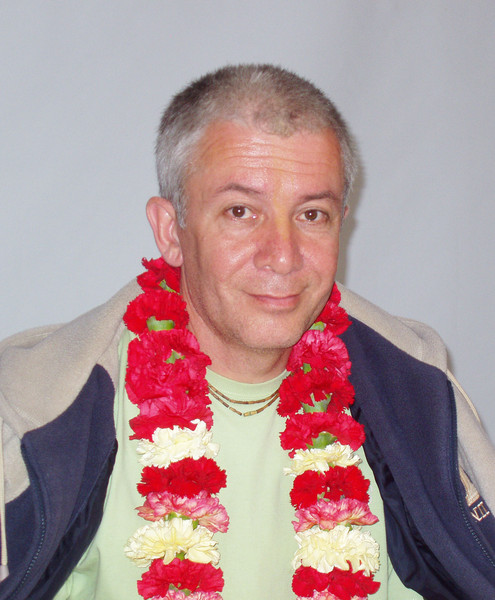
- Title: Guru

Personal life
- Born: Alexander Gennadievich Khakimov; March 1, 1958 (age 68) Georgievka, Kazakh SSR
- Website: www.ahakimov.com

Religious life
- Religion: Hinduism
- Sect: Gaudiya Vaishnavism
- Monastic name: Chaitanya Chandra Charan Das
- Initiation: 1988 by Harikesa Swami

Chaitanya Chandra Charan Das (born Alexander Gennadievich Khakimov, Hindi: अलेक्जेंडर गेनाडिविच खाकिमोव, Russian: Александр Геннадьевич Хакимов; March 1, 1958) is a Russian Hindu Vaishnavite religious figure and preacher; guru and member of the Governing Council of the International Society for Krishna Consciousness (ISKCON).

== Biography ==
He grew up in the Far East of the USSR. In his school years he was fond of drawing. In 1978 he graduated from art school in Vladivostok. In 1982, in Leningrad, he first became acquainted with Hindu culture by reading the book "Beyond Time and Space" by ISKCON founder Bhaktivedanta Swami Prabhupada. In November 1985, he met the Hare Krishnas and began to practice bhakti yoga. Later he began to actively preach and distribute Hare Krishna literature in the USSR. In 1988, he received spiritual initiation and Sanskrit name "Caitanya Chandra Das" from the spiritual leader of Soviet Hare Krishnas Harikesa Swami. After Harikesi Swami left ISKCON in 1998, he received spiritual initiation from Jayapataka Swami in 2004, who gave him the name Chaitanya Chandra Charan Das.

He travels a lot, giving lectures on "Vedic philosophy and culture".

He is the author of several books: Karma. Reflections, Reincarnation. Reflections, Perfect Social Structure. Reflections, Levels of Consciousness. Reflections, Spiritual Family Life, Evolution of Consciousness, Illusion and Reality, Evolution of Beauty. His books were sales leaders at the Moscow Book Fair in 2016 — Evolution of Consciousness, in 2017 — Illusion and Reality, in 2018 — Evolution of Beauty.

His works Illusion and Reality in 2018 and Evolution of Consciousness in 2019 were awarded the Grand Prix of the Prize "For Goodness in Art" in the All-Russian competition "For the Good of the World", which marks the best works of literature and art of a humanistic orientation.

== Publications ==
- Чайтанья Чандра Чаран Дас. Духовная семейная жизнь. — Киев: Veda Press, 2002. — 67 с.
- Чайтанья Чандра Чаран Дас. Карма. Размышления. — Алматы: Институт ведической культуры, 2004. — 110 с.
- Чайтанья Чандра Чаран Дас. Карма. Размышления. — 2-е изд. — Алматы: Институт ведической культуры, 2007. — 110 с.
- Хакимов А. Г. Карма. Размышления. — 3-е изд. — Омск: Омскбланкиздат, 2010. — 112 с. — ISBN 9785804201464.
- Чайтанья Чандра Чаран Дас. Как я пришел в Сознание Кришны. Сборник писем и историй. — Омск: Поиск, 2005. — 592 с. — 1000 экз.
- Чайтанья Чандра Чаран Дас. Последний экзамен. — 2007. — 292 с.
- Чайтанья Чандра Чаран Дас. Реинкарнация. Размышления. — Алматы: Институт прикладных духовных технологий, 2008. — (Серия «Веды»).
- Хакимов А. Г. Реинкарнация. Размышления. — 2-е изд. — Омск: Омскбланкиздат, 2010. — 112 с. — 2000 экз. — ISBN 9785804201471.
- Чайтанья Чандра Чаран Дас. Грихастха Ашрам. Семейная духовная жизнь. — М.: Философская книга, 2009. — 224 с. — 2000 экз. — ISBN 9785902629641.
- Хакимов А. Г. Варнашрама-дхарма. Размышления. — Омск: Омскбланкиздат, 2010. — 112 с. — 3000 экз. — ISBN 9785804201518.
- Хакимов А. Г. Совершенное общественное устройство. Варнашрама-Дхарма. Размышления. — 2013. — 104 с. — 600 экз. — ISBN 978-6-17703-607-3.
- Хакимов А. Г. Уровни сознания. Размышления. — Омск: Омскоблиздат, 2011. — 136 с. — 8000 экз. — ISBN 978-5-8042-0188-4.
- Хакимов А. Г. Размышления(Карма. Реинкарнация. Варнашрама-дхарма. Уровни Сознания). — СПб: Веды, Институт прикладных духовных технологий, 2015. — 508 с. — 2000 экз. — ISBN 978-5-8042-0188-4.
- Александр Хакимов. Иллюзия и реальность. — Москва: Эксмо, 2017. — 208 с. — 10 000 экз. — ISBN 978-5-699-99562-2.
- Александр Хакимов. Эволюция сознания. — Москва: Эксмо, 2018. — 496 с. — 3000 экз. — ISBN 978-5-699-87300-5.
- Александр Хакимов. Карма. Как обрести высшую цель в своей жизни?. — Москва: Эксмо, 2018. — 128 с. — 5000 экз. — ISBN 978-5-04-092611-4.
- Александр Хакимов. Реинкарнация. Что ждет нас в следующей жизни?. — Москва: Эксмо, 2018. — 160 с. — 4000 экз. — ISBN 978-5-04-094656-3.
- Александр Хакимов. Эволюция красоты: авторский арт-альбом философа и художника. — Москва: Эксмо, 2018. — 240 с. — 4000 экз. — ISBN 978-5-04-095380-6.
