= Temple of the Seven Rishis =

Hindu temple in Russia

The Temple of the Seven Rishis (Russian: Храм Семи Риши, Chram Semi Rishi) is a Hindu temple located near Nizhny Novgorod and consecrated to the Saptarishi ("Seven Sages"), the patriarchs of the Vedic religion, embodiments of the seven stars of the Big Dipper constellation. The temple is also dedicated to Lord Dattatreya (the Trimurti), other Vedic or Hindu gods, and on its ground there are also statues of Greek gods.

The temple was built between 2009 and 2010 as part of the "Collection of Mysteries" (Russian: Собрание Тайн, Sobraniye Tayn) monastery on the "Divya Loka" (Russian: Дивья Лока) compound. One of the few of its kind, it is built according to the styles of Russian architecture with Classical elements, and shows traditional Hindu and Vedic religious themes and symbols in a European guise.

== See also ==
- Hinduism in Russia
- Religion in Russia
- Vedism
