= Hindu Council of Russia =

Hindu organisation based in Russia

Hindu Council, Russia
- Formation: December 19, 2011; 13 years ago
- Founder: Sadhu Priya Das
- Type: NGO
- Headquarters: Moscow, Russia
- Chairman: Sadhu Priya Das
- Website: hindu.ru

The Hindu Council of Russia (Russian: Совет индуистских общин России, СИОР) represents members of the Hindu religion in Russia. The council was created on December 19, 2011, in light of the Bhagavad Gita trial in Russia, by Hindus from India, Bangladesh, Mauritius, Nepal and other countries residing in Russia. Sadhu Priya Das is the current chairman.

== See also ==
- Hinduism in Russia
