= Bhakti Vijnana Goswami =

Uzbek-born religious official (born 1956)

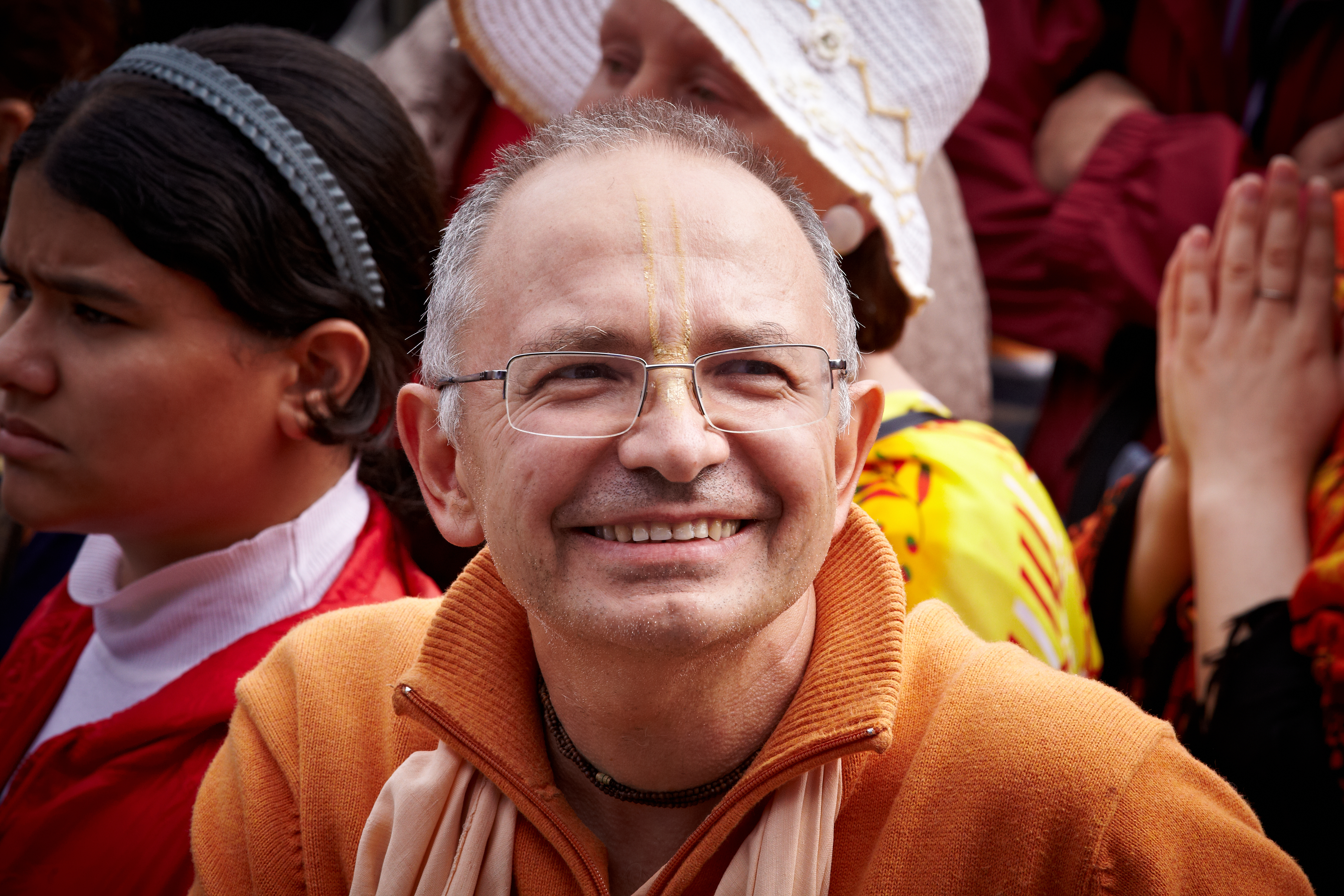
- Bhakti Vijnana Goswami, 2011

Personal life
- Born: Vadim Tuneev; 30 August 1956 (age 70) Tashkent, Uzbek SSR, USSR

Religious life
- Religion: Hinduism
- Order: Sannyasa
- Sect: Gaudiya Vaishnavism
- Initiation: Diksa–1983, Sannyasa–2001

Religious career
- Post: GBC–1997
- Predecessor: Radhanath Swami

Bhakti Vijnana Goswami (IAST: Bhakti Vijñāna Gosvāmī; born as Vadim Tuneev, 30 August 1956, Tashkent, Uzbekistan) is a Gaudiya Vaishnava guru and a leader for the International Society for Krishna Consciousness (ISKCON).

A Bhakti Yoga practitioner and preacher since the 1980s, Bhakti Vijnana Goswami has been leader of ISKCON communities in Russia for two decades. He is a disciple of Radhanath Swami. Before joining the monastic order, Bhakti Vijnana Goswami was a chemical sciences scholar, with a PhD in molecular biology.

Bhakti Vijnana Goswami has written books in Russian on the Bhagavad Gita, spiritual transformation, the structure and philosophy of religious systems, and the healing nature of prayer.

== Early life ==
Vadim Tuneev was born on August 30, 1956, in Tashkent in a family of scientists who were staunch atheists. His mother was a philologist PhD at the Academy of Sciences in Tashkent and his father, a Finance Institute graduate, was department head of cybernetics at the Leningrad Agricultural Institute.

Vadim was an inquiring child. He read substantially, mostly science fiction. He was also fond of entomology and chemistry. Since he was openhearted and friendly, he always had good friends.

Until the age of 17, Vadim lived under the care of his grandparents in Tashkent. His grandfather was an agricultural scientist – a chemist, professor, and head of department at the Agriculture Institute. Vadim was very close to his grandfather and followed in his footsteps to become a scientist.

== Moscow University and the spiritual search (1973–1978) ==
Vadim graduated from school in 1973 and the same year entered Moscow University to study chemistry. He began as a dedicated student who was sociable, open and enjoyed popularity among friends. However, by the end of the first year, he was overtaken by a deep disappointment, feeling doubtful and uninspired “to live for the sake of the periodic system of Mendeleev and some chemical reactions...”

The cornerstone of Vadim's spiritual search came with the death of his classmate Ivan Raevsky. Raevsky had been faced with a terminal illness in the form of cancer but until his final days continued to attend classes and pass tests, leaving Vadim's consciousness reverberating with the question: “What should a person do at the verge of death?”

In 1975, Vadim became close to a Baptist student who dared to declare his faith in God amid strict political enforcement of atheism. Vadm's Baptist friend was eventually thrown out of university but not before he gave Vadim the Gospel of John. Through his reading, Vadim's questions abounded, though he had to wait a few years before he met with his answers.

== Conversion to Vaishnavism (1978–1983) ==
In 1978, Vadim was accepted into postgraduate studies at the Institute for Molecular Biology at the Russian Academy of Sciences with promising prospects of an accomplished career in scientific research. At the same time, he encountered Gaudiya Vaishnavism (a strand of Hinduism) after befriending Japa Dasa, a fellow student living next door in his university dormitory who was a Hare Krishna devotee.

Influenced by this new friendship, Vadim became a vegetarian and began reading the Bhagavad Gita, the classical Hindu scripture. He attended Hare Krishna meetings at various apartments, and soon took up the meditational practice of chanting God's names on beads. The meetings were often secret, as the political regime of the time dealt harshly with religious believers. Vadim and several dozen students gathered regularly at the reading rooms of the Moscow Engineering Physics Institute, to hear discourses by Sergey Mitrofanov (later named Surya Dasa).

Anatoly Pinyaev, (later named Ananta Shanti Dasa) the first Soviet Hare Krishna devotee, would also come to preach at these meetings. He was the only source of spiritual information for new devotees as there were no translations of books written by the Society's founder Srila Prabhupada. In 1983, Vadim took first initiation from Harikesa Swami, the ISKCON leader in USSR and received his spiritual name Vaidyanatha Dasa.

== Persecution by KGB (1983) ==
The KGB began persecuting Soviet Hare Krishna devotees in 1982, forcing them into hiding. Meetings were held in forests near Moscow. The two most active preachers Vishvamitra and Surya were arrested and imprisoned. The Soviet press launched a campaign denouncing ISKCON as an American anti-communist sect intended to ideologically sabotage and undermine the Soviet system.

Despite the prohibitions, Vaidyanatha continued to practice and even brought new acquaintances and friends to programs. From early 1983, the KGB began investigating him. A Colonel Belopotapov visited Vaidyanatha at his workplace and asked him to cooperate with the state security agency and spy on the religious Society. Vaidyanatha refused.

The KGB left off Vaidyanatha for a short phase until he organized the religious celebration of Gaura Purnima in a friend's apartment. The KGB were informed and prosecuted attendees. Because Vaidyanatha wasn't considered directly involved in active preaching, he wasn't remanded and acted as a witness in court.

As soon as the trial was over, Vaidyanatha returned to Tashkent to escape the intense pressure and further interrogations. However, the KGB kept track of him and began a series of interrogations there, threatening and cajoling him. Vaidyanatha continued to communicate with devotees and eventually openly defied the KGB by ignoring their demands to meet.

A year and a half later Vaidyanatha returned to Moscow and began translating and editing books by Srila Prabhupada into Russian. He was invited to Sweden by the Society's publishing head to do this work without danger, but Vaidyanatha postponed the opportunity to remain in Moscow.

== Defense of PhD and emigration to Sweden ==
In 1987, Vaidyanatha defended his thesis on the ‘Structure of nucleosomes’. Soon afterwards the KGB renewed their interest in him. They launched a new investigation that posed a serious threat of arrest. Because of this, Vaidyanatha was fired from his research post. He left for Lithuania to continue his translating work, then moved to Leningrad (now St. Petersburg) and finally left the USSR for Sweden in 1988 on the pretext of a fictitious marriage.

== Publishing work (1988–1995) ==
With only two fellow Russian devotees, Vaidyanatha found the culture and way of life in Sweden difficult for the first year. He was head of the translation department, where he guided a team of devotees in translating Srila Prabhupada's books into Russian and other languages of the Soviet bloc.

When the Soviet Union collapsed in 1991, devotees could finally enter and exit Russia freely. Vaidyanatha visited Russia at the same time as the first ISKCON temple was established in Moscow, at Begovaya Street, near the metro station. Kirtiraja Dasa, the head of ISKCON Russia, urged him to take up headship of the temple, but Vaidyanatha followed Harikesa Swami's advice to return to Sweden and complete translating and editing Srila Prabhupada's books.

== Leadership of ISKCON Russia (1995–2005) ==
Vaidyanatha returned to Russia in 1995 to lead the Society. He soon became known for his lectures and seminars, which were characterized as deeply insightful and charismatic, and attracted large numbers of followers throughout the Russian-speaking region. Vaidyanatha also gave regular discourses on a radio station for several years.

Vaidyanatha was made member of the Governing Body Commission of ISKCON in 1996. He was the first admitted member who was not a direct disciple of Srila Prabhupada. Two years later, he took shelter of Radhanath Swami as his spiritual guru and on 4 August 2001 became the first Russian Vaishnava to receive monastic sannyasa (the renounced order of life), and the new spiritual name Bhakti Vijnana Goswami. In 2005, he accepted the responsibility as an initiating guru who guides disciples on their spiritual journey.

== Writings and hobbies ==
From his youth, Bhakti Vijnana Goswami read extensively; he loved literature, poetry, philosophy and history. As well as English, Bhakti Vijnana Goswami is versed in Sanskrit, Bengali and Hindi. He practices bhakti yoga, and spends his time visiting holy places, studying scriptures of the world, and keeping contact with close devotee friends.

In 2001, Bhakti Vijnana Goswami published a Russian translation of Sharanagati, the collection of verses by Bhaktivinoda Thakura. This has been followed by several books in Russian that are currently being translated into English.

== Bibliography ==
- V. Tuneev. The Structure of Nucleosomes: the Development of Methods of Histone Molecules DNA. Moscow University 1986.
- Sharanagati (2001) translation of Bhaktivinoda Thakura's poetry of the same name
- The Arrow of Grace (2011) on the Bhagavat-Gita and its inner meaning
- Krishna Enters Mathura (2012) on the Shrimad Bhagavatam scripture
- On the Shores of the Bhakti Ocean (2014) on the Nectar of Devotion scripture
- The Secret of Stability in a World of Change (2015) on spiritual and personal transformation
- Lessons of Love (2015) on the life stories and lessons from Srila Prabhupada
- Parallels (2018) on the philosophy and structure of religious systems
- The Origins of the Gaudiya Sampradaya (2018) on the history, philosophy and contribution of Gaudiya Vaishnavism
- Deep Healing Prayers (2019) meditations on the prayers of Queen Kunti, from the Shrimad Bhagavatam

== Literature ==
- Дударенок С. М. (Dudarenok S. M.) (2004) (2004), Научный редактор Е.А. Поправко (E.A. Amendment) (ed.), Нетрадиционные религии на Дальнем Востоке России: история и современность (Non-traditional religions in the Russian Far East: History and Modernity), Владивосток (Vladivostok): Издательство Дальневосточного университета (Far Eastern University Press), p. 532, ISBN 978-5-7444-1640-9
- Здоровец Я. И., Мухин А. А. (2005), Конфессии и секты в России: религиозная, политическая и экономическая деятельность, М.: Центр политической информации, p. 201
- Мухин А. А., Здоровец Я. И. (2005), Религиозные конфессии и секты, М.: Алгоритм, p. 288, ISBN 978-5-9265-0194-7
- Под ред. Н. А. Трофимчука, ed. (1998), Новые религиозные культы, движения и организации в России. Словарь-справочник, М.: РАГС при Президенте РФ
- Пашаева Н. М. (2003), Новые религиозные организации, секты и движения в России, М.: Государственная публичная историческая библиотека России, ISBN 978-5-85209-130-7
- Чайтанья Чандра Чаран Дас (2005), Как я пришел в Сознание Кришны. Сборник писем и историй, Омск: Поиск
- Щипков, Д. (2002), "Русское сознание Кришны", Независимая газета
- Дышкант, В. В. (2004), "Способный примирять", Столичные новости, vol. 9, no. 300, archived from the original on 2006-05-22
- Волчек, Д. (2004), "Строительство индуистского храма в Москве", Radio Svoboda, archived from the original on 2012-03-27
- Cole, Richard J. (2007), "Forty Years of Chanting: A Study of the Hare Krishna Movement from its Foundation to the Present Day", in Graham Dwyer, Richard J. Cole (ed.), The Hare Krishna Movement: Forty Years of Chant and Change, London: I.B. Tauris, pp. 26–53, ISBN 978-1-84511-407-7
- Fasman, Jon (November 15, 2002), "He Went From Biology to Bhakti", The Moscow Times
- Mehta, Mona (December 28, 2011), "Moscow courts had dismissed Gita cases", The Times of India, archived from the original on March 19, 2012
- Mehta, Mona (January 2, 2012), "The Gita on trial", The Times of India, archived from the original on March 19, 2012
