= KOM (bulletin board system) =

KOM is a type of bulletin board system, with a text-based (as opposed to a menu based) input system. The first was QZ KOM, but soon others imitated the user interface.

The QZKOM system was first opened in 1978, which probably makes it the first Swedish-developed forum service. It was banned by the Swedish government late the same year, reopened with permission in 1979.

Before the introduction of QZKOM, QZ ran the American system Forum-Planet which provided similar services but only for very small user groups.

One of the larger KOM systems outside QZ was Permobas, which was sponsored by Permobil. The first version ran on two (later seven) ABC 80 with 300 bit/s modems connected to a 5 or 10 MB hard disk. One of the Permobas users was Henrik Schyffert. Schyffert later started his own BBS named "Ring så spelar vi". When Permobas was shut down in December 1985 the users were moved over to the newly started Computext. Computext was funded by Lars Olof Kanngards foundation IFF - Institutet för Framtiden (The Institute For the Future) and the tech team was based on the two master-brains: Mats Engström, Göran Olsson and Allan Varcoe and later also Per Melin. The old ABC80 become thanks to sponsorship from Digital Equipment a later version was operating its services on PDP computers and later on VAX systems. Computext ran until the late 1990s. Lars Olof Kanngard and IFF sold its operation to Esselte and all the services continued under the name Esselte Voice AB.

== See also ==
- SklaffKOM
