= Harikesa Swami =

Harikesa Das (IAST: Harikeśa dāsa), formerly known as Harikesa Swami (Harikeśa Svāmī) and by the honorific Vishnupada (Viṣṇupāda), born Robert Campagnola, was one of the leading disciples of A. C. Bhaktivedanta Swami Prabhupada and a guru within the International Society of Krishna Consciousness (commonly known as 'the International Society for Krishna Consciousness|Hare Krishnas' or ISKCON). He left ISKCON in 1998.

== ISKCON ==
He personally met the founder of ISKCON, A.C. Bhaktivedanta Swami Prabhupada, in Brooklyn, while recording Prabhupada's music in July 1971. Harikesa Swami was initiated by Prabhupada in New York, July 1971, and given the name Harikesa dasa.

== Zonal Acarya time ==
When the founder of the ISKCON religious movement left, the leadership of the faith was divided up on 11 of the most prominent disciples of the Guru, and Harikesa was one of them. The world was divided into 11different preaching zones, and the leader for each zone was called acarya. The zone of leadership for Harikesa was northern Europe, including Scandinavia, Germany, Switzerland and Austria, and the East European countries and the whole of the Soviet Union.

Under the leadership of Harikesa, the ISKCON faith was spread widely over all of his allotted zone, and the number of members and centres of ISKCON multiplied in the area.

The preaching efforts were dependent on having translation of the books written by the leader of the ISKCON movement, A.C. Bhaktivedanta Swami Prabhupada, and under the direction of Harikesa a new branch of the Bhaktivedanta Book Trust publishing house in Sweden, and collected around him new members of the ISKCON movement who could translate the collected books to their respective languages. This was the time before desktop publishing, and just in the beginning of photo typesetting. Harikesa lead a group of his followers to develop their own computerised desktop publishing computer equipment, to be able to produce all the different languages, which also included developing own phototypesetting fonts. With his idea, every new language got their own customised personal computer, which were transported or smuggled into the respective country, and the ready translated books were sent on diskettes to the publishing house central, where all the final steps of book production were performed. By this streamline production scheme, it was possible to produce a lot of titles of the ISKCON books, in a very short time, and with only a very lightweight core crew to do the actual book publishing work. This was practically speaking the invention of desktop publishing before its time.

By that work, soon the translated books of the ISKCON faith started coming to all the Soviet Union countries in their native language, which in turn initiated and caused the spread of the ISKCON religious movement in those countries.

Apart from leading this book publishing work, Harikesa was also the spiritual leader of his zone, and travelled a lot to the countries in his area to oversee the opening of new ISKCON centerers, accepting new disciples, and leading them into the ISKCON faith.

Leadership of the Northern Europe branch of the BBT book publishing time continued all the time until 1998, upon which time it continued with the leadership of those of his former disciples who stayed in the ISKCON organisation.

== COM System ==
As the publishing expanded, in the early 80s the BBT programmer, Prsni, suggested the creation of an internal conferencing system and a PDP-11 minicomputer system was purchased and a limited internal conferencing system, based on the popular KOM (BBS) system was installed. Soon it became apparent that the capacity to discuss the publishing affairs in conference format greatly increased the capacity of the BBT. Considering that Harikesa Swami was now travelling almost non-stop throughout an expanding area and engaging in publishing in dozens of languages, the system was enhanced to allow users to dial into the network from anywhere in the world. This system, renamed COM, connected all parts of ISKCON and the BBT in real-time, and was soon carrying hundreds of communications a day long before the creation of the www or the on-line usage of the internet. Harikesa Swami was instrumental in facilitating and organising this development from the first day. Later, as the system became larger with many thousands of users, programmers were brought in to create a user interface to allow desktop organisation of the texts in the conferences and personal mail.

== Resignation from ISKCON ==
Harikesa collapsed due to stress and overwork in the summer 1998, after having accepted even more responsibilities in addition to those he already had. He also had a sexual affair with a woman named Monica. After that he decided to resign from all ISKCON duties, and of being a spiritual leader and guru in ISKCON, and instead to retire to a more personal sphere. His resignation was accepted by ISKCON's Governing Body Commission meetings in 1999.

== Recording Artist ==
Harikesa dasa has been producing music that bridges the gap between classical music from Western culture and Eastern Mantra since 1978. Harikesa Swami has produced more than 28 albums (under the group names of Rasa, BLISS, Sri Hari and Siva Hari).

== Bibliography ==
- Harikesa Swami, Varnasrama Manifesto for Social Sanity, 1981, Bhaktivedanta Book Trust, ISBN 0-89213-042-3. Edited by Devamrita Swami.
- Harikesa Swami, The Thirteenth Chapter, Bhaktivedanta Book Trust, 1985, ISBN 91-85580-46-5
- Harikesa Swami, The Krsna Conscious Handbook, Underground Soviet Publication during the Cold War, 1986
- Harikesa Swami, Why I Come to this Material World?, last chapter from the book Our OPriginal Position, edited by GBC Press.
- Harikesa Swami, Basic Management Book for ISKCON Temples, ISKCON publication, 1989
- Harikesa Swami, Essential Truths – The Questions and Answers Conference 1989–1994, 1996, Sentient Press, ISBN 91-7149-296-8
- Harikesa Swami, All glories to the Sankirtana devotees, 1996, Sentient Press, ISBN 91-7149-298-4
- Harikesa Swami, On Social Issues, 1998, Sentient Press,ISBN 91-7149-392-1
- Harikesa Swami, The Leadership and Management Seminar, 1998, Sentient Press, Video and Audio Cassette Packs

== Discography ==
Year	Band	Title	Label
1978	RASA	Oasis	Bhaktivedanta Book Trust
1979	RASA	Coming into Full Bloom	Bhaktivedanta Book Trust
1980	RASA	Setting the Scene	Bhaktivedanta Book Trust
1980	RASA	Alive	Bhaktivedanta Book Trust
1981	RASA	Creation	Bhaktivedanta Book Trust
1981	RASA	Transparent Media	Bhaktivedanta Book Trust
1982	RASA	Dancing on the Head of the Serpent	Bhaktivedanta Book Trust
1982	RASA	Swinging	Bhaktivedanta Book Trust
1983	RASA	Universal Forum	Bhaktivedanta Book Trust
1987	BLISS	Along the Edge	Bhaktivedanta Book Trust
1988	BLISS	Rebellion	Bhaktivedanta Book Trust
1988	BLISS	Blissed Out	Bhaktivedanta Book Trust
1988	Stick of Saffron	Treasure Island	Bhaktivedanta Book Trust
1988	BLISS	Wings to Fly	Bhaktivedanta Book Trust
1991	BLISS	The Future Belongs to Me	Bhaktivedanta Book Trust
1992	BLISS	Connected	Bhaktivedanta Book Trust
1993	BLISS	Under a Desire Tree	Bhaktivedanta Book Trust
1994	BLISS	Illumination	Bhaktivedanta Book Trust
1994	BLISS	Remember	Bhaktivedanta Book Trust
1994	Gauranga Bhajan Band	Chant!	Bhaktivedanta Book Trust
1995	BLISS	Rosewater	Bhaktivedanta Book Trust
1995	BLISS	For Your Pleasure	Bhaktivedanta Book Trust
1997	BLISS	Mother Bliss	Bhaktivedanta Book Trust
1994	Sri Hari	Rising Sign	Bhaktivedanta Book Trust
1996	Sri Hari	One But Different	Bhaktivedanta Book Trust
2002	Hari	Living Dream	Earthfuture Media
2008	Siva Hari	Deli	Harimedia Music
2008	Siva Hari	Innuendo	Harimedia Music
