= Bhagavad-Gītā As It Is =

Translation and commentary published by ISKCON

Revised And Enlarged Edition (1983) front cover.

The Bhagavad-Gītā As It Is is a translation and commentary of the Bhagavad Gita by A. C. Bhaktivedanta Swami Prabhupada, founder of the International Society for Krishna Consciousness (ISKCON), commonly known as the Hare Krishna movement. This translation of Bhagavad Gita emphasizes a path of devotion toward the personal god, Krishna. It was first published in 1968 in English by Macmillan Publishers, and is now available in nearly sixty languages. It is primarily promoted and distributed by members of ISKCON.

== Contents ==
For each verse, the book (in complete editions) includes the Devanagari script, a Latin transliteration, word-for-word Sanskrit-English meanings, and English translation. An extensive commentary by Prabhupada is given throughout, based on various Gaudiya Vaishnava works, including: Ramanuja Bhasya (in Sanskrit); Sarartha-varsini-tika (Sanskrit) by Visvanatha Chakravarti Thakura; Gita-bhusana-tika (Sanskrit) by Baladeva Vidyabhushana; and Bhaktivinode Thakur's Bengali commentaries.

The narrative in the Bhagavad-Gītā concerns a dialogue between Lord Krishna and a mighty warrior named Arjuna on the battlefield of Kurukshetra. In the narrative, Krishna has descended to earth to aid Arjuna in his battle against Kauravas and their army. Krishna assumes the role of Arjuna's chariot driver and aids him in the battle and reveals to Arjuna several divine truths about human existence in the material plane, the true nature of the supreme personality of God, and the method of eternal progression and release from the earthly cycles of death and rebirth through the practice of bhakti yoga. The narrative teaches that achieving Krishna consciousness and attaining the inner realization that all life is a manifestation of the eternal energy of Krishna will release an individual soul from the cycles of reincarnation (death and rebirth). The narrative culminates with Krishna revealing to Arjuna his universal form which encompasses all life and material existence. One notable event in the narrative is when Arjuna gazes at the opposing army and sees his relatives fighting for the opposing army, he is filled with grief and remorse that he must kill his own flesh and blood. In reply, Krishna reveals his true form to Arjuna and tells him that it does not matter if his relatives die in the battle today because they will eventually die anyway, and that Arjuna's duty to the supreme lord and his own self-realization transcends his material attachments to his relatives. The central message of the text is that nothing ever truly dies and that all life is in a continual cycle of death and rebirth, and that one has a duty to the process of self-realization and progression in order to manifest the supreme personality of God and achieve Krishna Consciousness, thereby escaping the eternal cycles of death and rebirth.

The book advocates the path of bhakti toward Krishna, who is seen as the Supreme Personality of Godhead himself. It establishes that Krishna is not an incarnation, but the cause of all causes and source of all incarnations. He is even the cause of Vishnu. It teaches the loving service of the transcendental personality of the Lord.

Bhagavad-Gītā As It Is is written in the tradition of Gaudiya Vaishnavism, whose followers regard the Bhagavad Gita as the essence of the Vedic knowledge and the Upanishads, and consider the book authoritative and literally true.

== Substance ==
Bhagavad-Gītā As It Is suggests a way of life for the contemporary Western world, and is derived from the Manu Smriti and other books of Hindu religious and social law. In this way of life, ideal human society is described as being divided into four varnas (brahmana – intellectuals, kshatriya – administrators, vaishya – merchants, shudra – workers). Within his writings, Prabhupada supports the view that one becomes a member of one of the varnas, not by one's birth (lineage), but by one's personal qualities (guṇa) and the type of work (karma) one actually performs (BG 4.13). Society is described as best ruled by a benevolent kshatriya sovereign, who is to govern according to rules set by scriptural tradition and preserved by self-controlled and pure-hearted spiritual leaders (brahmanas). The kshatriya sovereign (like courts in many democratic states) may also order capital punishment.

Brahmanas, elders, women, children and cows are said to deserve special protection, with animals, especially cows, being preserved from slaughter at all costs. Prabhupada encouraged readers to adopt a lacto-vegetarian diet and gives agriculture as the ideal economic basis of society. Prabhupada concluded that the society should be "Krishna conscious"—enlightened by devotion (bhakti) to Krishna.

== Edition history ==
A. C. Bhaktivedanta Swami Prabhupada, the author, arrived in the United States in 1965. In 1966, he had founded the International Society for Krishna Consciousness (ISKCON) in a storefront at 26 2nd. Ave, New York City. At that time, he was very anxious to publish his Bhagavad-gita As It Is. Macmillan Publishers agreed to publish a 400-page version in 1968, but the original manuscript was over 1000 pages, so the first Macmillan edition was known as the "Abridged Edition".

By 1972, the "Abridged Edition" sales were substantial, and Macmillan agreed to publish the "Complete Edition".

After Srila Prabhupada died in 1977, the Bhaktivedanta Book Trust (BBT) published in 1983 a "Revised and Enlarged" posthumous edition containing at least one thousand substantial changes. The changes were justified as being "closer to the original manuscript". This edition has been very controversial among the followers of Srila Prabhupada.

In 2001, Krishna Books Inc (KBI), who are licensed by the BBT, reprinted the 1972 "Complete Edition", so now both the "Complete" and "Revised and Enlarged" editions are available.

== Distribution ==
Prabhupada's translation is sold outside India due to the efforts of Hare Krishna members on the streets, in airports, and in other public places. The book also enjoys brisk sales within India. It has been published in sixty languages, including French, German, Danish, Spanish, Dutch, Portuguese, Italian, Swedish, Russian, Polish, Czech, Slovak, Latvian, Ukrainian, Greek, Macedonian, Bulgarian, Hungarian, Georgian, Serbo-Croatian, Chinese, Japanese, Arabic, Hebrew, Persian, Nepali, Hindi, Bengali, Assamese, Gujarati, Kannada, Marathi, Malayalam, Odia, Tamil, and Telugu.

== Recognition ==
On 4 December 2025, Prime Minister of India Narendra Modi presented a Russian copy of Prabhupada's Bhagavad-Gītā As It Is to the President of Russia Vladimir Putin during Putin's state visit to India, writing in his official X account: "Presented a copy of the Gita in Russian to President Putin. The teachings of the Gita give inspiration to millions across the world." The note added to the gift explained: "Its timeless wisdom inspires ethical living, mind control, and inner peace, with translations making it accessible to modern readers worldwide".

== Trial ==
In June 2011, a group linked to the Russian Orthodox Church had demanded a ban owing to an alleged "conflict of interests" between the Russian followers of Krishna and local authorities in the Siberian region of Tomsk. The case was dismissed by a federal judge on 28 December 2011.

Russian ambassador Alexander Kadakin condemned the "madmen" seeking the ban, underlining that Russia was a secular country:

Russia is a secular and democratic country where all religions enjoy equal respect... Even more applicable it is to the holy scriptures of various faiths -- whether it is the Bible, the Holy Quran, Torah, Avesta and, of course, Bhagavad Gita -- the great source of wisdom for the people of India and the world.

About 15,000 Indians in Moscow and followers of ISKCON in Russia asked the Indian government to intervene to resolve the issue. The move triggered strong protests by Members of Parliament as they wanted the Indian Government to take up the matter strongly with Russia. The final hearing in the Tomsk district court was then scheduled on 28 December, with the court agreeing to seek the opinion of the Russian Ombudsman on human rights in the Tomsk region as well as Indologists from Moscow and St Petersburg. The prosecutor's office filed an appeal against the judge's ruling, but on 21 March 2012, the appeal court upheld the decision of the lower court, rejecting the prosecutor's petition.
