= Hinduism in Russia =

Russian Hindus

Total population
- 140,000 (2011); 0.1% of its total population

Religions
- Hinduism; Majority: Vaishnavism (Krishnaism); Minority: Shaivism and Slavic Vedism

Scriptures
- Bhagavad Gita, Bhagavatam and Vedas

Languages
- Sacred: Sanskrit; Other: Russian & Other Russian languages

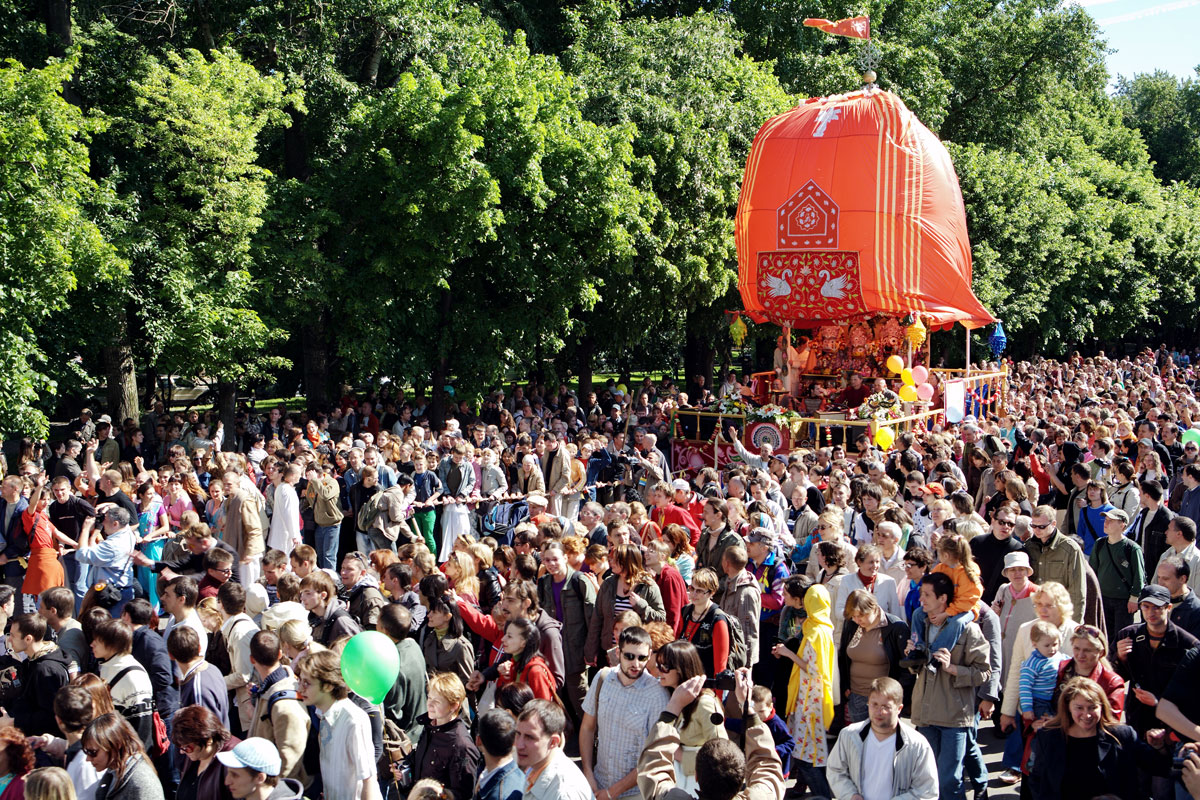
ISKCON Moscow Ratha Yatra

Hinduism has been spread in Russia primarily due to the work of scholars from the religious organization International Society for Krishna Consciousness (ISKCON) and by itinerant Swamis from India and small communities of Indian immigrants. While ISKCON appears to have a relatively strong following in Russia, the other organizations in the list also have a presence in this country. There is an active Tantra Sangha operating in Russia. According to the 2012 official census, there are 140,010 Hindus in Russia, which accounts for 0.1% of the population of Russia.

== History ==
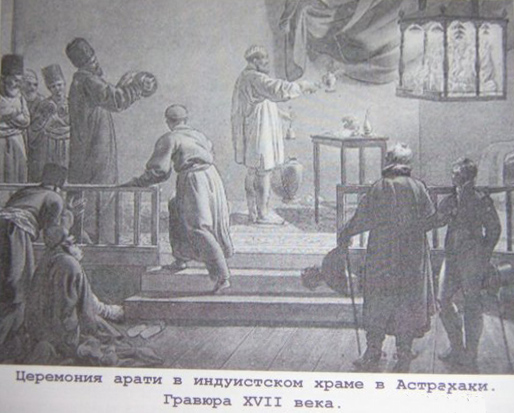
Early 19th century engraving depicting Hindu temple in Astrakhan, Russia.

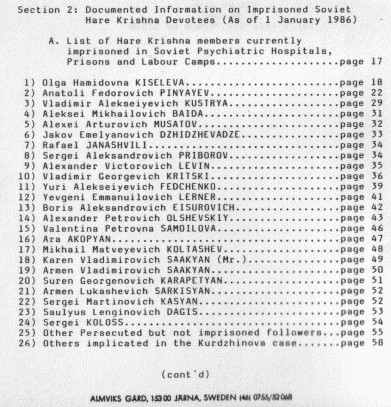
The Human rights publication list to free Hare Krishnas in the Soviet Union.

The history of Hinduism in Russia dates back to at least the 16th century. When Astrakhan was conquered in 1556, the small Indian community became part of the Moscow state.

By the early 17th century, Indian merchants, mainly Multanis and Shikarpuris from Sindh and Punjab, had established a permanent settlement in Astrakhan. Tsar Michael Fedorovich (r. 1613–1645) encouraged them to build an Indian dvor (“Indian Court”), a walled compound containing living quarters, warehouses, and a small Hindu temple. These merchants, described by travellers such as Adam Olearius, Peter Pallas, and George Forster, practised daily rituals before images of Vishnu and Kali, lit lamps, performed ablutions in the Volga, and celebrated festivals such as Diwali. In 1683, the Tsar granted the Astrakhan Hindus official permission to cremate their dead outside the city, making it one of the earliest legal recognitions of Hindu rites in Russia.

In the early eighteenth century, the first Russian emperor, Peter the Great, met the head of the Astrakhan Hindus and, at their request, asked the Russian Senate to issue a law protecting Hindu beliefs. This was the first law in Russia that protected a foreign creed.

By the mid-eighteenth century, observers such as the Prussian naturalist Peter Simon Pallas noted the presence of hundreds of Multani Vaiṣṇava Hindu merchant families at the mouth of the Volga River, where their temple in the Indiiskii dvor remained active. From the seventeenth to the early nineteenth centuries, Astrakhan functioned as a northern outpost of Hinduism in Eurasia, maintaining continuous worship under official Russian tolerance before the community’s decline as caravan trade through Bukhara and Iran waned.

In 1971 A.C. Bhaktivedanta Swami Prabhupada, the founder of the International Society for Krishna Consciousness (ISKCON), introduced it to Russia. In 1988, ISKCON was first registered as a religion. Later, it was re-registered in 1998. In the same year, there were 120 Krishna communities in Russia.

== Hindu denominations ==
=== Vaishnavism ===
As of December 2005, the Federal Registration Service recorded 79 Hindu groups with a particular orientation on Krishnaism. These are the International Society for Krishna Consciousness, ISKCON Revival Movement, Science of Identity Foundation, Sri Chaitanya Saraswat Math, Sri Chaitanya Gaudiya Math, Sri Krishna Chaitanya Mission, Sri Gopinatha Gaudiya Math, International Pure Bhakti Yoga Society, among others.

=== Shaivism ===
The followers of Shaivism in Russia are the Naths, Lingayats (Veerashaiva), and Tantra Sangha.

=== Hindu reform movements ===
Hindu reform movements which have presence in Russia are the Brahma Kumaris, Ramakrishna Mission, Arya Samaj, Sri Aurobindo Ashram, International Sivananda Yoga Vedanta Centres, Ananda Marga, Ananda Sangha, Self-Realization Fellowship, Sri Ramana Ashram, Sahaja Yoga, Sri Chinmoy Centre, Sanatan Sanstha, Sathya Sai Baba movement, Science of Identity Foundation, Shri Prakash Dham, the organizations associated with Maharishi Mahesh Yogi and Haidakhan Babaji (Haidakhandi Samaj), and others. Brahma Kumaris have 20 centres, Ramakrishna Mission has one centre, Ananda Marga has a centre in Barnaul, Tantra Sangha has one registered branch in Moscow and another in Nizhniy Novgorod was officially recognized in 1993.

== Demography ==
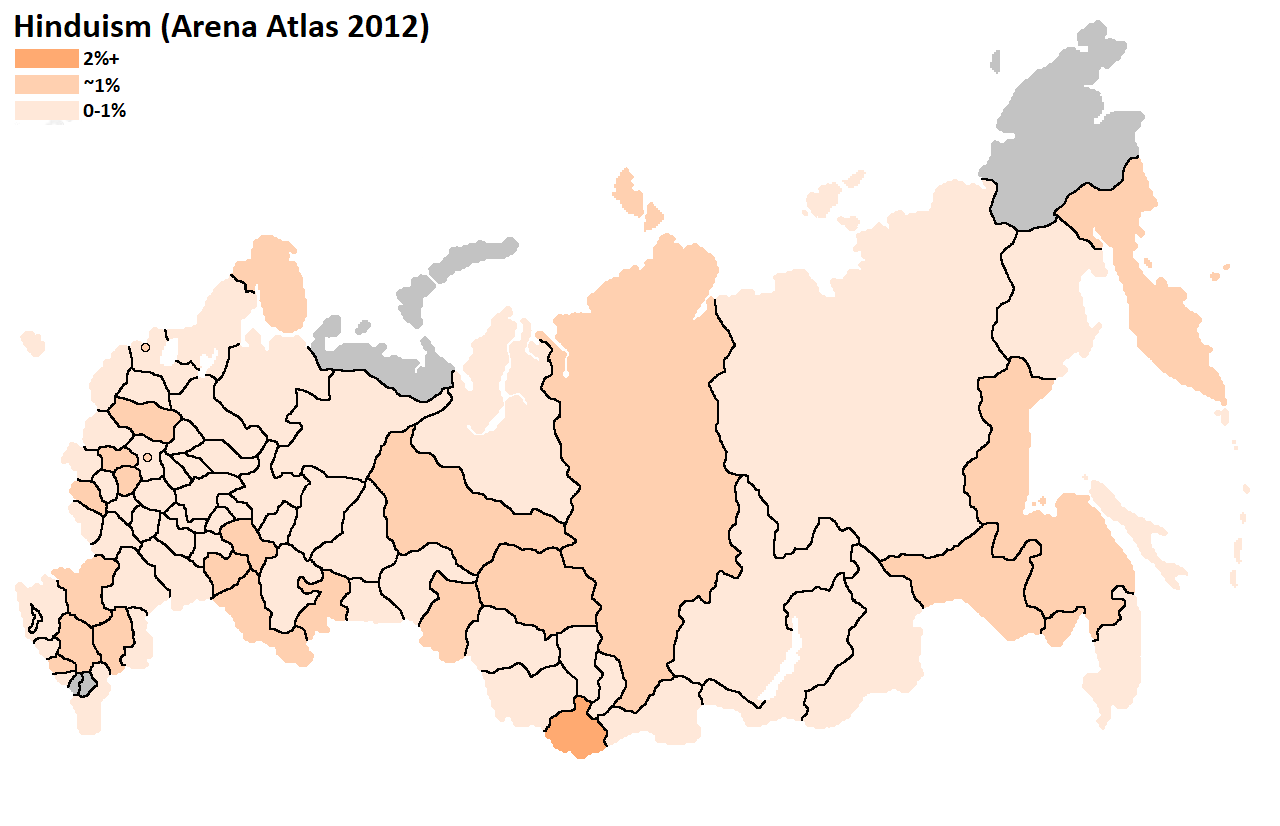
Hinduism in Russia

According to the 2012 official census, Hinduism is practised by 140,000 people, or 0.1% of the total population. It constitutes 2% of the population in the Altai Republic, 5% in Samara Oblast, 4% in Khakassia, Kalmykia, Bryansk Oblast, Kamchatka, Kurgan Oblast, Tyumen Oblast and Chelyabinsk Oblast, 3% in Sverdlovsk Oblast, 2% to 3% in Yamalia, Krasnodar Krai, Stavropol Krai, Rostov Oblast and Sakhalin Oblast, and 0.1% to 0.2% in other federal subjects.

In 2006, the Russian capital Moscow had an estimated 10,000 Hare Krishna devotees and at least 5,000 Indians, Sri Lankans, Nepalese, and Mauritians following Hindu denominations.

The number of ISKCON followers in Russia is disputed. According to Sanjeet Jha of the Association of Indians of Russia, Russia's Krishna devotee population is estimated to be as high as 250,000, while Filatov of the Institute of Oriental Studies estimates Russia's Krishna population to be 15,000. According to Bhakti Vijnana Goswami, a Russian ISKCON guru, there were 50,000 active Hare Krishna devotees in Russia in 2011.

== See also ==
- Astrakhan Oblast
- Bhagavad Gita trial in Russia
- Hindu Council of Russia
- Hinduism by country
- Religion in Russia

== Sources ==
- Knorre, Boris (2005). "Индуизм" [Hinduism]. In Bourdeaux, Michael; Filatov, Sergey (eds.). Современная религиозная жизнь России. Опыт систематического описания [Contemporary religious life of Russia. Systematic description of experiences] (in Russian). Vol. 3. Moscow: Keston Institute; Logos. pp. 335–454. ISBN 5-98704-044-2.
- Kotin, I. U. Индийцы в России=Indians in Russia. — Саарбрюкен: LAP, 2011. — 97 p. (in Russian and English)
- Tkatcheva, Anna (1994). "Neo-Hindu Movements and Orthodox Christianity in Post-Communist Russia". India International Centre Quarterly. 21 (2/3): 151–162. JSTOR 23003642.
